

490001–490100 

|-bgcolor=#E9E9E9
| 490001 ||  || — || September 26, 2008 || Kitt Peak || Spacewatch || — || align=right | 1.7 km || 
|-id=002 bgcolor=#fefefe
| 490002 ||  || — || September 26, 2008 || Kitt Peak || Spacewatch || — || align=right data-sort-value="0.56" | 560 m || 
|-id=003 bgcolor=#fefefe
| 490003 ||  || — || September 26, 2008 || Kitt Peak || Spacewatch || — || align=right data-sort-value="0.57" | 570 m || 
|-id=004 bgcolor=#fefefe
| 490004 ||  || — || September 27, 2008 || Mount Lemmon || Mount Lemmon Survey || — || align=right data-sort-value="0.65" | 650 m || 
|-id=005 bgcolor=#E9E9E9
| 490005 ||  || — || September 30, 2008 || La Sagra || OAM Obs. || — || align=right | 1.1 km || 
|-id=006 bgcolor=#E9E9E9
| 490006 ||  || — || September 30, 2008 || La Sagra || OAM Obs. || EUN || align=right data-sort-value="0.96" | 960 m || 
|-id=007 bgcolor=#FA8072
| 490007 ||  || — || September 26, 2008 || Kitt Peak || Spacewatch || H || align=right data-sort-value="0.52" | 520 m || 
|-id=008 bgcolor=#d6d6d6
| 490008 ||  || — || September 5, 2008 || Kitt Peak || Spacewatch || — || align=right | 2.5 km || 
|-id=009 bgcolor=#d6d6d6
| 490009 ||  || — || September 28, 2008 || Mount Lemmon || Mount Lemmon Survey || — || align=right | 2.4 km || 
|-id=010 bgcolor=#d6d6d6
| 490010 ||  || — || September 7, 2008 || Mount Lemmon || Mount Lemmon Survey || — || align=right | 3.2 km || 
|-id=011 bgcolor=#fefefe
| 490011 ||  || — || September 20, 2008 || Mount Lemmon || Mount Lemmon Survey || — || align=right data-sort-value="0.73" | 730 m || 
|-id=012 bgcolor=#d6d6d6
| 490012 ||  || — || September 21, 2008 || Kitt Peak || Spacewatch || KOR || align=right | 1.3 km || 
|-id=013 bgcolor=#FA8072
| 490013 ||  || — || September 30, 2008 || Mount Lemmon || Mount Lemmon Survey || — || align=right data-sort-value="0.65" | 650 m || 
|-id=014 bgcolor=#C2FFFF
| 490014 ||  || — || September 5, 2008 || Kitt Peak || Spacewatch || L4 || align=right | 8.2 km || 
|-id=015 bgcolor=#fefefe
| 490015 ||  || — || September 23, 2008 || Kitt Peak || Spacewatch || — || align=right data-sort-value="0.71" | 710 m || 
|-id=016 bgcolor=#d6d6d6
| 490016 ||  || — || September 22, 2008 || Kitt Peak || Spacewatch || — || align=right | 2.9 km || 
|-id=017 bgcolor=#fefefe
| 490017 ||  || — || September 23, 2008 || Mount Lemmon || Mount Lemmon Survey || — || align=right data-sort-value="0.76" | 760 m || 
|-id=018 bgcolor=#fefefe
| 490018 ||  || — || September 26, 2008 || Kitt Peak || Spacewatch || V || align=right data-sort-value="0.59" | 590 m || 
|-id=019 bgcolor=#E9E9E9
| 490019 ||  || — || September 23, 2008 || Kitt Peak || Spacewatch || (5) || align=right data-sort-value="0.63" | 630 m || 
|-id=020 bgcolor=#fefefe
| 490020 ||  || — || September 23, 2008 || Kitt Peak || Spacewatch || — || align=right data-sort-value="0.73" | 730 m || 
|-id=021 bgcolor=#d6d6d6
| 490021 ||  || — || September 24, 2008 || Kitt Peak || Spacewatch || — || align=right | 2.5 km || 
|-id=022 bgcolor=#d6d6d6
| 490022 ||  || — || September 24, 2008 || Mount Lemmon || Mount Lemmon Survey || — || align=right | 2.9 km || 
|-id=023 bgcolor=#E9E9E9
| 490023 ||  || — || September 25, 2008 || Kitt Peak || Spacewatch || — || align=right data-sort-value="0.69" | 690 m || 
|-id=024 bgcolor=#d6d6d6
| 490024 ||  || — || September 22, 2008 || Mount Lemmon || Mount Lemmon Survey || KOR || align=right | 1.5 km || 
|-id=025 bgcolor=#d6d6d6
| 490025 ||  || — || September 20, 2008 || Kitt Peak || Spacewatch || EOS || align=right | 1.9 km || 
|-id=026 bgcolor=#E9E9E9
| 490026 ||  || — || September 23, 2008 || Kitt Peak || Spacewatch || — || align=right | 1.3 km || 
|-id=027 bgcolor=#d6d6d6
| 490027 ||  || — || September 29, 2008 || Catalina || CSS || — || align=right | 3.1 km || 
|-id=028 bgcolor=#E9E9E9
| 490028 ||  || — || September 22, 2008 || Kitt Peak || Spacewatch || — || align=right data-sort-value="0.77" | 770 m || 
|-id=029 bgcolor=#d6d6d6
| 490029 ||  || — || September 23, 2008 || Kitt Peak || Spacewatch || — || align=right | 2.9 km || 
|-id=030 bgcolor=#d6d6d6
| 490030 ||  || — || September 25, 2008 || Kitt Peak || Spacewatch || — || align=right | 2.8 km || 
|-id=031 bgcolor=#FA8072
| 490031 ||  || — || October 6, 2008 || Catalina || CSS || H || align=right data-sort-value="0.54" | 540 m || 
|-id=032 bgcolor=#d6d6d6
| 490032 ||  || — || October 1, 2008 || La Sagra || OAM Obs. || — || align=right | 2.7 km || 
|-id=033 bgcolor=#fefefe
| 490033 ||  || — || September 4, 2008 || Kitt Peak || Spacewatch || — || align=right data-sort-value="0.70" | 700 m || 
|-id=034 bgcolor=#d6d6d6
| 490034 ||  || — || September 23, 2008 || Kitt Peak || Spacewatch || EOS || align=right | 1.3 km || 
|-id=035 bgcolor=#fefefe
| 490035 ||  || — || September 5, 2008 || Kitt Peak || Spacewatch || (2076) || align=right data-sort-value="0.65" | 650 m || 
|-id=036 bgcolor=#C2FFFF
| 490036 ||  || — || September 23, 2008 || Kitt Peak || Spacewatch || L4 || align=right | 5.7 km || 
|-id=037 bgcolor=#E9E9E9
| 490037 ||  || — || October 1, 2008 || Mount Lemmon || Mount Lemmon Survey || NEM || align=right | 1.7 km || 
|-id=038 bgcolor=#fefefe
| 490038 ||  || — || September 6, 2008 || Mount Lemmon || Mount Lemmon Survey || — || align=right data-sort-value="0.71" | 710 m || 
|-id=039 bgcolor=#E9E9E9
| 490039 ||  || — || October 1, 2008 || Mount Lemmon || Mount Lemmon Survey || — || align=right | 1.6 km || 
|-id=040 bgcolor=#fefefe
| 490040 ||  || — || October 1, 2008 || Mount Lemmon || Mount Lemmon Survey || — || align=right data-sort-value="0.57" | 570 m || 
|-id=041 bgcolor=#fefefe
| 490041 ||  || — || October 1, 2008 || Kitt Peak || Spacewatch || — || align=right data-sort-value="0.54" | 540 m || 
|-id=042 bgcolor=#E9E9E9
| 490042 ||  || — || September 2, 2008 || Kitt Peak || Spacewatch || AGN || align=right | 1.1 km || 
|-id=043 bgcolor=#E9E9E9
| 490043 ||  || — || September 24, 2008 || Mount Lemmon || Mount Lemmon Survey || — || align=right data-sort-value="0.87" | 870 m || 
|-id=044 bgcolor=#d6d6d6
| 490044 ||  || — || September 24, 2008 || Kitt Peak || Spacewatch || EOS || align=right | 2.1 km || 
|-id=045 bgcolor=#fefefe
| 490045 ||  || — || October 2, 2008 || Kitt Peak || Spacewatch || — || align=right data-sort-value="0.62" | 620 m || 
|-id=046 bgcolor=#d6d6d6
| 490046 ||  || — || October 2, 2008 || Kitt Peak || Spacewatch || — || align=right | 1.7 km || 
|-id=047 bgcolor=#fefefe
| 490047 ||  || — || October 2, 2008 || Kitt Peak || Spacewatch || MAS || align=right data-sort-value="0.57" | 570 m || 
|-id=048 bgcolor=#fefefe
| 490048 ||  || — || October 2, 2008 || Catalina || CSS || — || align=right data-sort-value="0.80" | 800 m || 
|-id=049 bgcolor=#fefefe
| 490049 ||  || — || October 2, 2008 || Kitt Peak || Spacewatch || — || align=right data-sort-value="0.55" | 550 m || 
|-id=050 bgcolor=#d6d6d6
| 490050 ||  || — || September 23, 2008 || Mount Lemmon || Mount Lemmon Survey || — || align=right | 3.0 km || 
|-id=051 bgcolor=#d6d6d6
| 490051 ||  || — || September 22, 2008 || Mount Lemmon || Mount Lemmon Survey || — || align=right | 3.1 km || 
|-id=052 bgcolor=#E9E9E9
| 490052 ||  || — || September 7, 2008 || Mount Lemmon || Mount Lemmon Survey || — || align=right | 1.2 km || 
|-id=053 bgcolor=#d6d6d6
| 490053 ||  || — || October 2, 2008 || Kitt Peak || Spacewatch || — || align=right | 2.9 km || 
|-id=054 bgcolor=#d6d6d6
| 490054 ||  || — || March 23, 2006 || Kitt Peak || Spacewatch || — || align=right | 2.4 km || 
|-id=055 bgcolor=#fefefe
| 490055 ||  || — || September 6, 2008 || Mount Lemmon || Mount Lemmon Survey || — || align=right data-sort-value="0.71" | 710 m || 
|-id=056 bgcolor=#E9E9E9
| 490056 ||  || — || September 2, 2008 || Kitt Peak || Spacewatch || — || align=right data-sort-value="0.55" | 550 m || 
|-id=057 bgcolor=#E9E9E9
| 490057 ||  || — || September 2, 2008 || Kitt Peak || Spacewatch || critical || align=right data-sort-value="0.62" | 620 m || 
|-id=058 bgcolor=#d6d6d6
| 490058 ||  || — || October 3, 2008 || Mount Lemmon || Mount Lemmon Survey || — || align=right | 3.2 km || 
|-id=059 bgcolor=#E9E9E9
| 490059 ||  || — || September 23, 2008 || Kitt Peak || Spacewatch || — || align=right data-sort-value="0.70" | 700 m || 
|-id=060 bgcolor=#d6d6d6
| 490060 ||  || — || September 26, 1998 || Kitt Peak || Spacewatch || — || align=right | 1.8 km || 
|-id=061 bgcolor=#d6d6d6
| 490061 ||  || — || September 25, 2008 || Kitt Peak || Spacewatch || — || align=right | 2.8 km || 
|-id=062 bgcolor=#d6d6d6
| 490062 ||  || — || September 5, 2008 || Kitt Peak || Spacewatch || — || align=right | 2.7 km || 
|-id=063 bgcolor=#FA8072
| 490063 ||  || — || September 24, 2008 || Kitt Peak || Spacewatch || — || align=right data-sort-value="0.48" | 480 m || 
|-id=064 bgcolor=#E9E9E9
| 490064 ||  || — || September 24, 2008 || Kitt Peak || Spacewatch || critical || align=right data-sort-value="0.71" | 710 m || 
|-id=065 bgcolor=#fefefe
| 490065 ||  || — || October 6, 2008 || Kitt Peak || Spacewatch || — || align=right data-sort-value="0.57" | 570 m || 
|-id=066 bgcolor=#E9E9E9
| 490066 ||  || — || October 6, 2008 || Catalina || CSS || — || align=right | 1.8 km || 
|-id=067 bgcolor=#d6d6d6
| 490067 ||  || — || September 22, 2008 || Kitt Peak || Spacewatch || — || align=right | 3.1 km || 
|-id=068 bgcolor=#fefefe
| 490068 ||  || — || October 6, 2008 || Kitt Peak || Spacewatch || — || align=right data-sort-value="0.56" | 560 m || 
|-id=069 bgcolor=#d6d6d6
| 490069 ||  || — || October 2, 2008 || Kitt Peak || Spacewatch || — || align=right | 2.0 km || 
|-id=070 bgcolor=#FA8072
| 490070 ||  || — || September 22, 2008 || Kitt Peak || Spacewatch || — || align=right data-sort-value="0.76" | 760 m || 
|-id=071 bgcolor=#fefefe
| 490071 ||  || — || October 6, 2008 || Kitt Peak || Spacewatch || NYS || align=right data-sort-value="0.50" | 500 m || 
|-id=072 bgcolor=#fefefe
| 490072 ||  || — || September 21, 2008 || Kitt Peak || Spacewatch || — || align=right data-sort-value="0.60" | 600 m || 
|-id=073 bgcolor=#E9E9E9
| 490073 ||  || — || October 7, 2008 || Catalina || CSS || — || align=right data-sort-value="0.96" | 960 m || 
|-id=074 bgcolor=#fefefe
| 490074 ||  || — || September 4, 2008 || Kitt Peak || Spacewatch || ERIcritical || align=right data-sort-value="0.78" | 780 m || 
|-id=075 bgcolor=#fefefe
| 490075 ||  || — || September 6, 2008 || Mount Lemmon || Mount Lemmon Survey || — || align=right data-sort-value="0.90" | 900 m || 
|-id=076 bgcolor=#E9E9E9
| 490076 ||  || — || September 26, 2008 || Kitt Peak || Spacewatch || — || align=right | 1.7 km || 
|-id=077 bgcolor=#fefefe
| 490077 ||  || — || October 9, 2008 || Mount Lemmon || Mount Lemmon Survey || — || align=right data-sort-value="0.59" | 590 m || 
|-id=078 bgcolor=#E9E9E9
| 490078 ||  || — || September 2, 2008 || Kitt Peak || Spacewatch || (5) || align=right data-sort-value="0.61" | 610 m || 
|-id=079 bgcolor=#fefefe
| 490079 ||  || — || September 23, 2008 || Mount Lemmon || Mount Lemmon Survey || — || align=right data-sort-value="0.62" | 620 m || 
|-id=080 bgcolor=#d6d6d6
| 490080 ||  || — || October 9, 2008 || Mount Lemmon || Mount Lemmon Survey || — || align=right | 2.1 km || 
|-id=081 bgcolor=#fefefe
| 490081 ||  || — || September 28, 2008 || Mount Lemmon || Mount Lemmon Survey || — || align=right data-sort-value="0.58" | 580 m || 
|-id=082 bgcolor=#fefefe
| 490082 ||  || — || October 1, 2008 || Mount Lemmon || Mount Lemmon Survey || ERI || align=right | 1.2 km || 
|-id=083 bgcolor=#fefefe
| 490083 ||  || — || October 1, 2008 || Kitt Peak || Spacewatch || — || align=right data-sort-value="0.57" | 570 m || 
|-id=084 bgcolor=#d6d6d6
| 490084 ||  || — || October 7, 2008 || Kitt Peak || Spacewatch || KOR || align=right | 1.3 km || 
|-id=085 bgcolor=#fefefe
| 490085 ||  || — || October 1, 2008 || Kitt Peak || Spacewatch || — || align=right data-sort-value="0.62" | 620 m || 
|-id=086 bgcolor=#d6d6d6
| 490086 ||  || — || October 2, 2008 || Kitt Peak || Spacewatch || — || align=right | 2.4 km || 
|-id=087 bgcolor=#d6d6d6
| 490087 ||  || — || October 1, 2008 || Catalina || CSS || — || align=right | 3.7 km || 
|-id=088 bgcolor=#E9E9E9
| 490088 ||  || — || October 6, 2008 || La Sagra || OAM Obs. || — || align=right | 2.4 km || 
|-id=089 bgcolor=#d6d6d6
| 490089 ||  || — || October 6, 2008 || Kitt Peak || Spacewatch || EOS || align=right | 1.8 km || 
|-id=090 bgcolor=#E9E9E9
| 490090 ||  || — || October 9, 2008 || Kitt Peak || Spacewatch || — || align=right | 1.5 km || 
|-id=091 bgcolor=#fefefe
| 490091 ||  || — || October 17, 2008 || Kitt Peak || Spacewatch || H || align=right data-sort-value="0.47" | 470 m || 
|-id=092 bgcolor=#d6d6d6
| 490092 ||  || — || October 3, 2008 || Mount Lemmon || Mount Lemmon Survey || — || align=right | 2.6 km || 
|-id=093 bgcolor=#fefefe
| 490093 ||  || — || September 20, 2008 || Kitt Peak || Spacewatch || — || align=right data-sort-value="0.62" | 620 m || 
|-id=094 bgcolor=#E9E9E9
| 490094 ||  || — || October 7, 2008 || Kitt Peak || Spacewatch || — || align=right data-sort-value="0.67" | 670 m || 
|-id=095 bgcolor=#d6d6d6
| 490095 ||  || — || September 20, 2008 || Mount Lemmon || Mount Lemmon Survey || KOR || align=right | 1.1 km || 
|-id=096 bgcolor=#fefefe
| 490096 ||  || — || September 25, 2008 || Kitt Peak || Spacewatch || NYS || align=right data-sort-value="0.58" | 580 m || 
|-id=097 bgcolor=#d6d6d6
| 490097 ||  || — || October 20, 2008 || Kitt Peak || Spacewatch || — || align=right | 3.2 km || 
|-id=098 bgcolor=#E9E9E9
| 490098 ||  || — || September 29, 2008 || Kitt Peak || Spacewatch || MRX || align=right data-sort-value="0.86" | 860 m || 
|-id=099 bgcolor=#E9E9E9
| 490099 ||  || — || October 20, 2008 || Kitt Peak || Spacewatch || — || align=right data-sort-value="0.77" | 770 m || 
|-id=100 bgcolor=#d6d6d6
| 490100 ||  || — || October 20, 2008 || Kitt Peak || Spacewatch || — || align=right | 2.1 km || 
|}

490101–490200 

|-bgcolor=#fefefe
| 490101 ||  || — || September 29, 2008 || Catalina || CSS || H || align=right data-sort-value="0.62" | 620 m || 
|-id=102 bgcolor=#fefefe
| 490102 ||  || — || October 20, 2008 || Kitt Peak || Spacewatch || — || align=right data-sort-value="0.64" | 640 m || 
|-id=103 bgcolor=#d6d6d6
| 490103 ||  || — || October 20, 2008 || Kitt Peak || Spacewatch || — || align=right | 3.8 km || 
|-id=104 bgcolor=#d6d6d6
| 490104 ||  || — || October 1, 2008 || Kitt Peak || Spacewatch || KOR || align=right | 1.2 km || 
|-id=105 bgcolor=#E9E9E9
| 490105 ||  || — || October 20, 2008 || Kitt Peak || Spacewatch || — || align=right | 1.3 km || 
|-id=106 bgcolor=#E9E9E9
| 490106 ||  || — || October 20, 2008 || Kitt Peak || Spacewatch || — || align=right data-sort-value="0.83" | 830 m || 
|-id=107 bgcolor=#E9E9E9
| 490107 ||  || — || October 20, 2008 || Kitt Peak || Spacewatch || — || align=right | 1.2 km || 
|-id=108 bgcolor=#fefefe
| 490108 ||  || — || September 22, 2008 || Mount Lemmon || Mount Lemmon Survey || — || align=right data-sort-value="0.75" | 750 m || 
|-id=109 bgcolor=#d6d6d6
| 490109 ||  || — || October 20, 2008 || Kitt Peak || Spacewatch || 7:4 || align=right | 3.0 km || 
|-id=110 bgcolor=#E9E9E9
| 490110 ||  || — || September 25, 2008 || Mount Lemmon || Mount Lemmon Survey || — || align=right | 1.5 km || 
|-id=111 bgcolor=#E9E9E9
| 490111 ||  || — || September 21, 2008 || Kitt Peak || Spacewatch || — || align=right data-sort-value="0.66" | 660 m || 
|-id=112 bgcolor=#FA8072
| 490112 ||  || — || September 22, 2008 || Mount Lemmon || Mount Lemmon Survey || — || align=right data-sort-value="0.74" | 740 m || 
|-id=113 bgcolor=#E9E9E9
| 490113 ||  || — || September 26, 2008 || Kitt Peak || Spacewatch || — || align=right | 1.1 km || 
|-id=114 bgcolor=#fefefe
| 490114 ||  || — || October 20, 2008 || Mount Lemmon || Mount Lemmon Survey || MAS || align=right data-sort-value="0.59" | 590 m || 
|-id=115 bgcolor=#d6d6d6
| 490115 ||  || — || October 3, 2008 || Mount Lemmon || Mount Lemmon Survey || — || align=right | 2.4 km || 
|-id=116 bgcolor=#E9E9E9
| 490116 ||  || — || October 21, 2008 || Kitt Peak || Spacewatch || (5) || align=right data-sort-value="0.73" | 730 m || 
|-id=117 bgcolor=#E9E9E9
| 490117 ||  || — || October 21, 2008 || Kitt Peak || Spacewatch || — || align=right | 1.9 km || 
|-id=118 bgcolor=#E9E9E9
| 490118 ||  || — || October 21, 2008 || Kitt Peak || Spacewatch || — || align=right | 1.0 km || 
|-id=119 bgcolor=#fefefe
| 490119 ||  || — || October 21, 2008 || Kitt Peak || Spacewatch || — || align=right data-sort-value="0.66" | 660 m || 
|-id=120 bgcolor=#E9E9E9
| 490120 ||  || — || October 21, 2008 || Kitt Peak || Spacewatch || AGN || align=right | 1.1 km || 
|-id=121 bgcolor=#E9E9E9
| 490121 ||  || — || October 22, 2008 || Kitt Peak || Spacewatch || — || align=right | 1.9 km || 
|-id=122 bgcolor=#fefefe
| 490122 ||  || — || September 22, 2008 || Kitt Peak || Spacewatch || MAS || align=right data-sort-value="0.68" | 680 m || 
|-id=123 bgcolor=#fefefe
| 490123 ||  || — || October 23, 2008 || Mount Lemmon || Mount Lemmon Survey || — || align=right data-sort-value="0.71" | 710 m || 
|-id=124 bgcolor=#fefefe
| 490124 ||  || — || September 29, 2008 || Kitt Peak || Spacewatch || — || align=right data-sort-value="0.61" | 610 m || 
|-id=125 bgcolor=#fefefe
| 490125 ||  || — || October 23, 2008 || Kitt Peak || Spacewatch || — || align=right data-sort-value="0.70" | 700 m || 
|-id=126 bgcolor=#E9E9E9
| 490126 ||  || — || September 6, 2008 || Catalina || CSS || — || align=right | 1.8 km || 
|-id=127 bgcolor=#fefefe
| 490127 ||  || — || March 14, 2007 || Mount Lemmon || Mount Lemmon Survey || — || align=right data-sort-value="0.74" | 740 m || 
|-id=128 bgcolor=#fefefe
| 490128 ||  || — || October 9, 2008 || Kitt Peak || Spacewatch || — || align=right data-sort-value="0.57" | 570 m || 
|-id=129 bgcolor=#d6d6d6
| 490129 ||  || — || October 20, 2008 || Mount Lemmon || Mount Lemmon Survey || KOR || align=right | 1.0 km || 
|-id=130 bgcolor=#E9E9E9
| 490130 ||  || — || October 21, 2008 || Kitt Peak || Spacewatch || (5) || align=right data-sort-value="0.82" | 820 m || 
|-id=131 bgcolor=#E9E9E9
| 490131 ||  || — || October 22, 2008 || Kitt Peak || Spacewatch || — || align=right data-sort-value="0.63" | 630 m || 
|-id=132 bgcolor=#fefefe
| 490132 ||  || — || October 22, 2008 || Kitt Peak || Spacewatch || — || align=right data-sort-value="0.86" | 860 m || 
|-id=133 bgcolor=#E9E9E9
| 490133 ||  || — || October 22, 2008 || Kitt Peak || Spacewatch || — || align=right | 1.2 km || 
|-id=134 bgcolor=#fefefe
| 490134 ||  || — || October 22, 2008 || Kitt Peak || Spacewatch || V || align=right data-sort-value="0.58" | 580 m || 
|-id=135 bgcolor=#E9E9E9
| 490135 ||  || — || October 22, 2008 || Kitt Peak || Spacewatch || — || align=right | 1.5 km || 
|-id=136 bgcolor=#FA8072
| 490136 ||  || — || October 22, 2008 || Kitt Peak || Spacewatch || — || align=right | 1.1 km || 
|-id=137 bgcolor=#E9E9E9
| 490137 ||  || — || October 23, 2008 || Kitt Peak || Spacewatch || — || align=right | 1.7 km || 
|-id=138 bgcolor=#fefefe
| 490138 ||  || — || September 6, 2008 || Mount Lemmon || Mount Lemmon Survey || MAS || align=right data-sort-value="0.68" | 680 m || 
|-id=139 bgcolor=#E9E9E9
| 490139 ||  || — || September 22, 2008 || Mount Lemmon || Mount Lemmon Survey || — || align=right | 1.1 km || 
|-id=140 bgcolor=#E9E9E9
| 490140 ||  || — || October 23, 2008 || Kitt Peak || Spacewatch || — || align=right | 1.1 km || 
|-id=141 bgcolor=#fefefe
| 490141 ||  || — || September 22, 2008 || Mount Lemmon || Mount Lemmon Survey || — || align=right data-sort-value="0.83" | 830 m || 
|-id=142 bgcolor=#d6d6d6
| 490142 ||  || — || October 23, 2008 || Mount Lemmon || Mount Lemmon Survey || — || align=right | 2.1 km || 
|-id=143 bgcolor=#E9E9E9
| 490143 ||  || — || September 22, 2008 || Mount Lemmon || Mount Lemmon Survey || AEO || align=right | 1.2 km || 
|-id=144 bgcolor=#d6d6d6
| 490144 ||  || — || October 23, 2008 || Mount Lemmon || Mount Lemmon Survey || — || align=right | 2.4 km || 
|-id=145 bgcolor=#fefefe
| 490145 ||  || — || October 23, 2008 || Mount Lemmon || Mount Lemmon Survey || MAS || align=right data-sort-value="0.54" | 540 m || 
|-id=146 bgcolor=#d6d6d6
| 490146 ||  || — || September 24, 2008 || Mount Lemmon || Mount Lemmon Survey || — || align=right | 1.9 km || 
|-id=147 bgcolor=#E9E9E9
| 490147 ||  || — || October 23, 2008 || Kitt Peak || Spacewatch || — || align=right data-sort-value="0.60" | 600 m || 
|-id=148 bgcolor=#E9E9E9
| 490148 ||  || — || October 23, 2008 || Kitt Peak || Spacewatch || — || align=right | 1.3 km || 
|-id=149 bgcolor=#E9E9E9
| 490149 ||  || — || October 24, 2008 || Kitt Peak || Spacewatch || — || align=right | 1.8 km || 
|-id=150 bgcolor=#fefefe
| 490150 ||  || — || October 24, 2008 || Kitt Peak || Spacewatch || — || align=right data-sort-value="0.65" | 650 m || 
|-id=151 bgcolor=#E9E9E9
| 490151 ||  || — || October 4, 2008 || La Sagra || OAM Obs. || MAR || align=right | 1.1 km || 
|-id=152 bgcolor=#fefefe
| 490152 ||  || — || October 24, 2008 || Kitt Peak || Spacewatch || MAS || align=right data-sort-value="0.57" | 570 m || 
|-id=153 bgcolor=#E9E9E9
| 490153 ||  || — || October 27, 2008 || Kitt Peak || Spacewatch || — || align=right | 1.3 km || 
|-id=154 bgcolor=#fefefe
| 490154 ||  || — || September 6, 2008 || Mount Lemmon || Mount Lemmon Survey || critical || align=right data-sort-value="0.54" | 540 m || 
|-id=155 bgcolor=#d6d6d6
| 490155 ||  || — || October 2, 2008 || Kitt Peak || Spacewatch || — || align=right | 3.7 km || 
|-id=156 bgcolor=#E9E9E9
| 490156 ||  || — || September 6, 2008 || Mount Lemmon || Mount Lemmon Survey || — || align=right data-sort-value="0.74" | 740 m || 
|-id=157 bgcolor=#E9E9E9
| 490157 ||  || — || September 24, 2008 || Mount Lemmon || Mount Lemmon Survey || — || align=right | 1.2 km || 
|-id=158 bgcolor=#E9E9E9
| 490158 ||  || — || October 28, 2008 || Socorro || LINEAR || — || align=right | 1.5 km || 
|-id=159 bgcolor=#fefefe
| 490159 ||  || — || October 25, 2008 || Kitt Peak || Spacewatch || — || align=right data-sort-value="0.86" | 860 m || 
|-id=160 bgcolor=#E9E9E9
| 490160 ||  || — || October 25, 2008 || Kitt Peak || Spacewatch || — || align=right | 1.5 km || 
|-id=161 bgcolor=#d6d6d6
| 490161 ||  || — || September 5, 2008 || Kitt Peak || Spacewatch || — || align=right | 2.1 km || 
|-id=162 bgcolor=#E9E9E9
| 490162 ||  || — || September 29, 2008 || Mount Lemmon || Mount Lemmon Survey || — || align=right data-sort-value="0.98" | 980 m || 
|-id=163 bgcolor=#d6d6d6
| 490163 ||  || — || October 26, 2008 || Kitt Peak || Spacewatch || — || align=right | 2.8 km || 
|-id=164 bgcolor=#E9E9E9
| 490164 ||  || — || October 22, 2008 || Kitt Peak || Spacewatch || — || align=right data-sort-value="0.94" | 940 m || 
|-id=165 bgcolor=#E9E9E9
| 490165 ||  || — || October 26, 2008 || Kitt Peak || Spacewatch || (5) || align=right data-sort-value="0.67" | 670 m || 
|-id=166 bgcolor=#fefefe
| 490166 ||  || — || October 26, 2008 || Kitt Peak || Spacewatch || — || align=right data-sort-value="0.58" | 580 m || 
|-id=167 bgcolor=#E9E9E9
| 490167 ||  || — || October 26, 2008 || Kitt Peak || Spacewatch || — || align=right data-sort-value="0.87" | 870 m || 
|-id=168 bgcolor=#d6d6d6
| 490168 ||  || — || October 8, 2008 || Kitt Peak || Spacewatch || — || align=right | 2.9 km || 
|-id=169 bgcolor=#fefefe
| 490169 ||  || — || October 27, 2008 || Kitt Peak || Spacewatch || — || align=right data-sort-value="0.58" | 580 m || 
|-id=170 bgcolor=#E9E9E9
| 490170 ||  || — || October 27, 2008 || Kitt Peak || Spacewatch || — || align=right | 1.8 km || 
|-id=171 bgcolor=#B88A00
| 490171 ||  || — || October 27, 2008 || Mount Lemmon || Mount Lemmon Survey || Tj (2.72) || align=right | 7.6 km || 
|-id=172 bgcolor=#E9E9E9
| 490172 ||  || — || September 6, 2008 || Mount Lemmon || Mount Lemmon Survey || — || align=right | 1.2 km || 
|-id=173 bgcolor=#fefefe
| 490173 ||  || — || September 21, 2008 || Catalina || CSS || — || align=right data-sort-value="0.87" | 870 m || 
|-id=174 bgcolor=#d6d6d6
| 490174 ||  || — || October 27, 2008 || Kitt Peak || Spacewatch || — || align=right | 2.7 km || 
|-id=175 bgcolor=#E9E9E9
| 490175 ||  || — || October 27, 2008 || Kitt Peak || Spacewatch || AGN || align=right | 1.2 km || 
|-id=176 bgcolor=#fefefe
| 490176 ||  || — || October 27, 2008 || Mount Lemmon || Mount Lemmon Survey || — || align=right data-sort-value="0.52" | 520 m || 
|-id=177 bgcolor=#fefefe
| 490177 ||  || — || September 24, 2008 || Mount Lemmon || Mount Lemmon Survey || — || align=right data-sort-value="0.59" | 590 m || 
|-id=178 bgcolor=#d6d6d6
| 490178 ||  || — || October 28, 2008 || Mount Lemmon || Mount Lemmon Survey || — || align=right | 2.9 km || 
|-id=179 bgcolor=#fefefe
| 490179 ||  || — || October 28, 2008 || Kitt Peak || Spacewatch || — || align=right data-sort-value="0.71" | 710 m || 
|-id=180 bgcolor=#d6d6d6
| 490180 ||  || — || October 28, 2008 || Kitt Peak || Spacewatch || — || align=right | 2.5 km || 
|-id=181 bgcolor=#fefefe
| 490181 ||  || — || October 28, 2008 || Mount Lemmon || Mount Lemmon Survey || — || align=right data-sort-value="0.67" | 670 m || 
|-id=182 bgcolor=#fefefe
| 490182 ||  || — || April 14, 2007 || Kitt Peak || Spacewatch || — || align=right data-sort-value="0.67" | 670 m || 
|-id=183 bgcolor=#d6d6d6
| 490183 ||  || — || September 29, 2008 || Kitt Peak || Spacewatch || — || align=right | 2.0 km || 
|-id=184 bgcolor=#E9E9E9
| 490184 ||  || — || October 7, 2008 || Kitt Peak || Spacewatch || DOR || align=right | 2.4 km || 
|-id=185 bgcolor=#fefefe
| 490185 ||  || — || October 28, 2008 || Kitt Peak || Spacewatch || NYS || align=right data-sort-value="0.59" | 590 m || 
|-id=186 bgcolor=#fefefe
| 490186 ||  || — || February 24, 2006 || Kitt Peak || Spacewatch || — || align=right data-sort-value="0.57" | 570 m || 
|-id=187 bgcolor=#E9E9E9
| 490187 ||  || — || October 21, 2008 || Kitt Peak || Spacewatch || critical || align=right data-sort-value="0.59" | 590 m || 
|-id=188 bgcolor=#d6d6d6
| 490188 ||  || — || October 29, 2008 || Kitt Peak || Spacewatch || — || align=right | 1.8 km || 
|-id=189 bgcolor=#E9E9E9
| 490189 ||  || — || September 2, 2008 || Kitt Peak || Spacewatch || — || align=right | 1.9 km || 
|-id=190 bgcolor=#E9E9E9
| 490190 ||  || — || September 6, 2008 || Mount Lemmon || Mount Lemmon Survey || — || align=right data-sort-value="0.59" | 590 m || 
|-id=191 bgcolor=#fefefe
| 490191 ||  || — || October 20, 2008 || Kitt Peak || Spacewatch || — || align=right data-sort-value="0.48" | 480 m || 
|-id=192 bgcolor=#d6d6d6
| 490192 ||  || — || October 30, 2008 || Kitt Peak || Spacewatch || — || align=right | 2.1 km || 
|-id=193 bgcolor=#E9E9E9
| 490193 ||  || — || September 20, 2008 || Mount Lemmon || Mount Lemmon Survey || critical || align=right data-sort-value="0.75" | 750 m || 
|-id=194 bgcolor=#fefefe
| 490194 ||  || — || September 22, 2008 || Mount Lemmon || Mount Lemmon Survey || — || align=right data-sort-value="0.75" | 750 m || 
|-id=195 bgcolor=#fefefe
| 490195 ||  || — || September 23, 2008 || Kitt Peak || Spacewatch || — || align=right data-sort-value="0.61" | 610 m || 
|-id=196 bgcolor=#fefefe
| 490196 ||  || — || September 5, 2008 || Socorro || LINEAR || H || align=right data-sort-value="0.64" | 640 m || 
|-id=197 bgcolor=#fefefe
| 490197 ||  || — || October 30, 2008 || Kitt Peak || Spacewatch || — || align=right data-sort-value="0.82" | 820 m || 
|-id=198 bgcolor=#E9E9E9
| 490198 ||  || — || October 31, 2008 || Mount Lemmon || Mount Lemmon Survey || — || align=right | 1.7 km || 
|-id=199 bgcolor=#E9E9E9
| 490199 ||  || — || October 21, 2008 || Kitt Peak || Spacewatch || — || align=right | 1.0 km || 
|-id=200 bgcolor=#E9E9E9
| 490200 ||  || — || October 2, 1995 || Kitt Peak || Spacewatch || — || align=right | 1.00 km || 
|}

490201–490300 

|-bgcolor=#E9E9E9
| 490201 ||  || — || October 21, 2008 || Mount Lemmon || Mount Lemmon Survey || — || align=right | 1.9 km || 
|-id=202 bgcolor=#E9E9E9
| 490202 ||  || — || October 24, 2008 || Kitt Peak || Spacewatch || — || align=right | 1.7 km || 
|-id=203 bgcolor=#E9E9E9
| 490203 ||  || — || October 21, 2008 || Mount Lemmon || Mount Lemmon Survey || — || align=right | 1.2 km || 
|-id=204 bgcolor=#d6d6d6
| 490204 ||  || — || October 28, 2008 || Kitt Peak || Spacewatch || — || align=right | 3.4 km || 
|-id=205 bgcolor=#fefefe
| 490205 ||  || — || October 24, 2008 || Kitt Peak || Spacewatch || — || align=right data-sort-value="0.67" | 670 m || 
|-id=206 bgcolor=#d6d6d6
| 490206 ||  || — || October 23, 2008 || Mount Lemmon || Mount Lemmon Survey || — || align=right | 3.4 km || 
|-id=207 bgcolor=#fefefe
| 490207 ||  || — || October 28, 2008 || Kitt Peak || Spacewatch || MAS || align=right data-sort-value="0.57" | 570 m || 
|-id=208 bgcolor=#E9E9E9
| 490208 ||  || — || October 28, 2008 || Kitt Peak || Spacewatch || — || align=right | 1.6 km || 
|-id=209 bgcolor=#E9E9E9
| 490209 ||  || — || October 25, 2008 || Catalina || CSS || — || align=right | 2.2 km || 
|-id=210 bgcolor=#fefefe
| 490210 ||  || — || October 19, 2008 || Kitt Peak || Spacewatch || V || align=right data-sort-value="0.61" | 610 m || 
|-id=211 bgcolor=#fefefe
| 490211 ||  || — || October 25, 2008 || Mount Lemmon || Mount Lemmon Survey || — || align=right data-sort-value="0.87" | 870 m || 
|-id=212 bgcolor=#E9E9E9
| 490212 ||  || — || October 26, 2008 || Kitt Peak || Spacewatch || (5) || align=right data-sort-value="0.64" | 640 m || 
|-id=213 bgcolor=#fefefe
| 490213 ||  || — || October 22, 2008 || Kitt Peak || Spacewatch || — || align=right data-sort-value="0.68" | 680 m || 
|-id=214 bgcolor=#E9E9E9
| 490214 ||  || — || October 21, 2008 || Kitt Peak || Spacewatch || — || align=right | 1.1 km || 
|-id=215 bgcolor=#E9E9E9
| 490215 ||  || — || October 6, 2008 || Kitt Peak || Spacewatch || — || align=right data-sort-value="0.99" | 990 m || 
|-id=216 bgcolor=#E9E9E9
| 490216 ||  || — || September 22, 2008 || Mount Lemmon || Mount Lemmon Survey || critical || align=right data-sort-value="0.75" | 750 m || 
|-id=217 bgcolor=#d6d6d6
| 490217 ||  || — || October 10, 2008 || Mount Lemmon || Mount Lemmon Survey || — || align=right | 2.7 km || 
|-id=218 bgcolor=#fefefe
| 490218 ||  || — || November 7, 2008 || Andrushivka || Andrushivka Obs. || — || align=right | 2.3 km || 
|-id=219 bgcolor=#fefefe
| 490219 ||  || — || October 7, 2008 || Mount Lemmon || Mount Lemmon Survey || — || align=right data-sort-value="0.82" | 820 m || 
|-id=220 bgcolor=#fefefe
| 490220 ||  || — || November 2, 2008 || Mount Lemmon || Mount Lemmon Survey || — || align=right data-sort-value="0.69" | 690 m || 
|-id=221 bgcolor=#d6d6d6
| 490221 ||  || — || November 2, 2008 || Mount Lemmon || Mount Lemmon Survey || — || align=right | 2.8 km || 
|-id=222 bgcolor=#d6d6d6
| 490222 ||  || — || October 22, 2008 || Kitt Peak || Spacewatch || 7:4 || align=right | 3.2 km || 
|-id=223 bgcolor=#fefefe
| 490223 ||  || — || September 22, 2008 || Mount Lemmon || Mount Lemmon Survey || — || align=right data-sort-value="0.59" | 590 m || 
|-id=224 bgcolor=#C2FFFF
| 490224 ||  || — || November 6, 2008 || Mount Lemmon || Mount Lemmon Survey || L4 || align=right | 5.6 km || 
|-id=225 bgcolor=#E9E9E9
| 490225 ||  || — || October 26, 2008 || Kitt Peak || Spacewatch || (5) || align=right data-sort-value="0.71" | 710 m || 
|-id=226 bgcolor=#d6d6d6
| 490226 ||  || — || November 6, 2008 || Kitt Peak || Spacewatch || — || align=right | 2.0 km || 
|-id=227 bgcolor=#d6d6d6
| 490227 ||  || — || October 2, 2008 || Mount Lemmon || Mount Lemmon Survey || — || align=right | 2.5 km || 
|-id=228 bgcolor=#E9E9E9
| 490228 ||  || — || October 27, 2008 || Kitt Peak || Spacewatch || — || align=right | 2.0 km || 
|-id=229 bgcolor=#d6d6d6
| 490229 ||  || — || November 7, 2008 || Mount Lemmon || Mount Lemmon Survey || — || align=right | 3.3 km || 
|-id=230 bgcolor=#d6d6d6
| 490230 ||  || — || September 27, 2008 || Mount Lemmon || Mount Lemmon Survey || — || align=right | 2.8 km || 
|-id=231 bgcolor=#d6d6d6
| 490231 ||  || — || October 7, 2008 || Kitt Peak || Spacewatch || — || align=right | 2.3 km || 
|-id=232 bgcolor=#fefefe
| 490232 ||  || — || September 6, 2008 || Mount Lemmon || Mount Lemmon Survey || NYScritical || align=right data-sort-value="0.44" | 440 m || 
|-id=233 bgcolor=#d6d6d6
| 490233 ||  || — || October 10, 2008 || Mount Lemmon || Mount Lemmon Survey || — || align=right | 3.5 km || 
|-id=234 bgcolor=#E9E9E9
| 490234 ||  || — || November 7, 2008 || Mount Lemmon || Mount Lemmon Survey || (5) || align=right data-sort-value="0.74" | 740 m || 
|-id=235 bgcolor=#E9E9E9
| 490235 ||  || — || November 8, 2008 || Mount Lemmon || Mount Lemmon Survey || — || align=right | 1.5 km || 
|-id=236 bgcolor=#d6d6d6
| 490236 ||  || — || October 24, 2008 || Kitt Peak || Spacewatch || VER || align=right | 2.4 km || 
|-id=237 bgcolor=#fefefe
| 490237 ||  || — || November 17, 2008 || Kitt Peak || Spacewatch || — || align=right data-sort-value="0.56" | 560 m || 
|-id=238 bgcolor=#fefefe
| 490238 ||  || — || October 23, 2008 || Mount Lemmon || Mount Lemmon Survey || NYS || align=right data-sort-value="0.69" | 690 m || 
|-id=239 bgcolor=#fefefe
| 490239 ||  || — || October 26, 2008 || Kitt Peak || Spacewatch || MAS || align=right data-sort-value="0.59" | 590 m || 
|-id=240 bgcolor=#fefefe
| 490240 ||  || — || November 17, 2008 || Kitt Peak || Spacewatch || — || align=right data-sort-value="0.78" | 780 m || 
|-id=241 bgcolor=#E9E9E9
| 490241 ||  || — || November 17, 2008 || Kitt Peak || Spacewatch || — || align=right data-sort-value="0.98" | 980 m || 
|-id=242 bgcolor=#fefefe
| 490242 ||  || — || November 19, 2008 || Kitt Peak || Spacewatch || — || align=right data-sort-value="0.52" | 520 m || 
|-id=243 bgcolor=#fefefe
| 490243 ||  || — || November 1, 2008 || Mount Lemmon || Mount Lemmon Survey || NYS || align=right data-sort-value="0.61" | 610 m || 
|-id=244 bgcolor=#E9E9E9
| 490244 ||  || — || October 29, 2008 || Kitt Peak || Spacewatch || — || align=right | 1.2 km || 
|-id=245 bgcolor=#E9E9E9
| 490245 ||  || — || November 19, 2008 || Mount Lemmon || Mount Lemmon Survey || — || align=right data-sort-value="0.90" | 900 m || 
|-id=246 bgcolor=#fefefe
| 490246 ||  || — || November 20, 2008 || Kitt Peak || Spacewatch || — || align=right data-sort-value="0.85" | 850 m || 
|-id=247 bgcolor=#fefefe
| 490247 ||  || — || November 20, 2008 || Kitt Peak || Spacewatch || — || align=right data-sort-value="0.75" | 750 m || 
|-id=248 bgcolor=#fefefe
| 490248 ||  || — || October 23, 2008 || Kitt Peak || Spacewatch || — || align=right data-sort-value="0.65" | 650 m || 
|-id=249 bgcolor=#fefefe
| 490249 ||  || — || November 7, 2008 || Mount Lemmon || Mount Lemmon Survey || — || align=right data-sort-value="0.64" | 640 m || 
|-id=250 bgcolor=#E9E9E9
| 490250 ||  || — || October 8, 2008 || Mount Lemmon || Mount Lemmon Survey || — || align=right data-sort-value="0.81" | 810 m || 
|-id=251 bgcolor=#d6d6d6
| 490251 ||  || — || November 30, 2008 || Catalina || CSS || — || align=right | 4.8 km || 
|-id=252 bgcolor=#E9E9E9
| 490252 ||  || — || September 23, 2008 || Mount Lemmon || Mount Lemmon Survey || — || align=right data-sort-value="0.92" | 920 m || 
|-id=253 bgcolor=#d6d6d6
| 490253 ||  || — || November 21, 2008 || Kitt Peak || Spacewatch || — || align=right | 3.2 km || 
|-id=254 bgcolor=#d6d6d6
| 490254 ||  || — || November 17, 2008 || Kitt Peak || Spacewatch || — || align=right | 1.8 km || 
|-id=255 bgcolor=#fefefe
| 490255 ||  || — || November 30, 2008 || Kitt Peak || Spacewatch || MAS || align=right data-sort-value="0.86" | 860 m || 
|-id=256 bgcolor=#fefefe
| 490256 ||  || — || October 10, 2008 || Mount Lemmon || Mount Lemmon Survey || H || align=right data-sort-value="0.78" | 780 m || 
|-id=257 bgcolor=#fefefe
| 490257 ||  || — || November 19, 2008 || Mount Lemmon || Mount Lemmon Survey || — || align=right | 1.0 km || 
|-id=258 bgcolor=#d6d6d6
| 490258 ||  || — || November 21, 2008 || Mount Lemmon || Mount Lemmon Survey || — || align=right | 2.4 km || 
|-id=259 bgcolor=#E9E9E9
| 490259 ||  || — || September 29, 2008 || Mount Lemmon || Mount Lemmon Survey || — || align=right data-sort-value="0.74" | 740 m || 
|-id=260 bgcolor=#fefefe
| 490260 ||  || — || October 21, 2008 || Kitt Peak || Spacewatch || — || align=right data-sort-value="0.74" | 740 m || 
|-id=261 bgcolor=#fefefe
| 490261 ||  || — || November 19, 2008 || Kitt Peak || Spacewatch || MAS || align=right data-sort-value="0.65" | 650 m || 
|-id=262 bgcolor=#fefefe
| 490262 ||  || — || November 20, 2008 || Kitt Peak || Spacewatch || — || align=right data-sort-value="0.71" | 710 m || 
|-id=263 bgcolor=#E9E9E9
| 490263 ||  || — || December 2, 2008 || Kitt Peak || Spacewatch || — || align=right | 1.4 km || 
|-id=264 bgcolor=#fefefe
| 490264 ||  || — || November 30, 2008 || Mount Lemmon || Mount Lemmon Survey || — || align=right data-sort-value="0.74" | 740 m || 
|-id=265 bgcolor=#fefefe
| 490265 ||  || — || November 30, 2008 || Kitt Peak || Spacewatch || — || align=right data-sort-value="0.76" | 760 m || 
|-id=266 bgcolor=#E9E9E9
| 490266 ||  || — || November 6, 2008 || Mount Lemmon || Mount Lemmon Survey || — || align=right data-sort-value="0.84" | 840 m || 
|-id=267 bgcolor=#fefefe
| 490267 ||  || — || November 20, 2008 || Mount Lemmon || Mount Lemmon Survey || NYS || align=right data-sort-value="0.58" | 580 m || 
|-id=268 bgcolor=#fefefe
| 490268 ||  || — || December 21, 2008 || Mount Lemmon || Mount Lemmon Survey || MAS || align=right data-sort-value="0.68" | 680 m || 
|-id=269 bgcolor=#d6d6d6
| 490269 ||  || — || December 21, 2008 || Mount Lemmon || Mount Lemmon Survey || — || align=right | 2.2 km || 
|-id=270 bgcolor=#E9E9E9
| 490270 ||  || — || November 24, 2008 || Mount Lemmon || Mount Lemmon Survey || — || align=right | 1.1 km || 
|-id=271 bgcolor=#E9E9E9
| 490271 ||  || — || December 29, 2008 || Kitt Peak || Spacewatch || — || align=right | 1.2 km || 
|-id=272 bgcolor=#fefefe
| 490272 ||  || — || November 19, 2008 || Mount Lemmon || Mount Lemmon Survey || — || align=right data-sort-value="0.94" | 940 m || 
|-id=273 bgcolor=#fefefe
| 490273 ||  || — || December 29, 2008 || Mount Lemmon || Mount Lemmon Survey || — || align=right data-sort-value="0.74" | 740 m || 
|-id=274 bgcolor=#fefefe
| 490274 ||  || — || November 21, 2008 || Mount Lemmon || Mount Lemmon Survey || — || align=right data-sort-value="0.89" | 890 m || 
|-id=275 bgcolor=#d6d6d6
| 490275 ||  || — || December 29, 2008 || Mount Lemmon || Mount Lemmon Survey || — || align=right | 1.7 km || 
|-id=276 bgcolor=#fefefe
| 490276 ||  || — || December 29, 2008 || Mount Lemmon || Mount Lemmon Survey || — || align=right data-sort-value="0.76" | 760 m || 
|-id=277 bgcolor=#fefefe
| 490277 ||  || — || December 29, 2008 || Mount Lemmon || Mount Lemmon Survey || — || align=right data-sort-value="0.71" | 710 m || 
|-id=278 bgcolor=#E9E9E9
| 490278 ||  || — || November 6, 2008 || Mount Lemmon || Mount Lemmon Survey || — || align=right data-sort-value="0.83" | 830 m || 
|-id=279 bgcolor=#d6d6d6
| 490279 ||  || — || December 30, 2008 || Kitt Peak || Spacewatch || — || align=right | 1.9 km || 
|-id=280 bgcolor=#fefefe
| 490280 ||  || — || November 19, 2008 || Mount Lemmon || Mount Lemmon Survey || NYS || align=right data-sort-value="0.62" | 620 m || 
|-id=281 bgcolor=#fefefe
| 490281 ||  || — || December 29, 2008 || Kitt Peak || Spacewatch || MAS || align=right data-sort-value="0.71" | 710 m || 
|-id=282 bgcolor=#fefefe
| 490282 ||  || — || December 29, 2008 || Kitt Peak || Spacewatch || — || align=right data-sort-value="0.71" | 710 m || 
|-id=283 bgcolor=#fefefe
| 490283 ||  || — || December 22, 2008 || Kitt Peak || Spacewatch || — || align=right data-sort-value="0.71" | 710 m || 
|-id=284 bgcolor=#E9E9E9
| 490284 ||  || — || December 21, 2008 || Mount Lemmon || Mount Lemmon Survey || — || align=right data-sort-value="0.70" | 700 m || 
|-id=285 bgcolor=#d6d6d6
| 490285 ||  || — || December 21, 2008 || Kitt Peak || Spacewatch || — || align=right | 1.7 km || 
|-id=286 bgcolor=#E9E9E9
| 490286 ||  || — || November 8, 2008 || Mount Lemmon || Mount Lemmon Survey || — || align=right data-sort-value="0.90" | 900 m || 
|-id=287 bgcolor=#E9E9E9
| 490287 ||  || — || December 29, 2008 || Mount Lemmon || Mount Lemmon Survey || — || align=right data-sort-value="0.65" | 650 m || 
|-id=288 bgcolor=#E9E9E9
| 490288 ||  || — || December 30, 2008 || Kitt Peak || Spacewatch || — || align=right | 1.6 km || 
|-id=289 bgcolor=#fefefe
| 490289 ||  || — || December 30, 2008 || Kitt Peak || Spacewatch || V || align=right data-sort-value="0.60" | 600 m || 
|-id=290 bgcolor=#fefefe
| 490290 ||  || — || December 22, 2008 || Kitt Peak || Spacewatch || — || align=right data-sort-value="0.78" | 780 m || 
|-id=291 bgcolor=#fefefe
| 490291 ||  || — || December 30, 2008 || Kitt Peak || Spacewatch || — || align=right data-sort-value="0.86" | 860 m || 
|-id=292 bgcolor=#E9E9E9
| 490292 ||  || — || December 31, 2008 || Kitt Peak || Spacewatch || — || align=right | 1.3 km || 
|-id=293 bgcolor=#fefefe
| 490293 ||  || — || December 22, 2008 || Kitt Peak || Spacewatch || — || align=right data-sort-value="0.98" | 980 m || 
|-id=294 bgcolor=#fefefe
| 490294 ||  || — || December 2, 2008 || Kitt Peak || Spacewatch || — || align=right | 1.0 km || 
|-id=295 bgcolor=#fefefe
| 490295 ||  || — || December 22, 2008 || Kitt Peak || Spacewatch || NYS || align=right data-sort-value="0.56" | 560 m || 
|-id=296 bgcolor=#fefefe
| 490296 ||  || — || December 22, 2008 || Mount Lemmon || Mount Lemmon Survey || — || align=right data-sort-value="0.71" | 710 m || 
|-id=297 bgcolor=#d6d6d6
| 490297 ||  || — || December 30, 2008 || Mount Lemmon || Mount Lemmon Survey || EOS || align=right | 2.4 km || 
|-id=298 bgcolor=#fefefe
| 490298 ||  || — || December 29, 2008 || Kitt Peak || Spacewatch || — || align=right data-sort-value="0.71" | 710 m || 
|-id=299 bgcolor=#fefefe
| 490299 ||  || — || December 5, 2008 || Mount Lemmon || Mount Lemmon Survey || — || align=right data-sort-value="0.90" | 900 m || 
|-id=300 bgcolor=#fefefe
| 490300 ||  || — || December 22, 2008 || Kitt Peak || Spacewatch || — || align=right data-sort-value="0.78" | 780 m || 
|}

490301–490400 

|-bgcolor=#E9E9E9
| 490301 ||  || — || November 30, 2008 || Catalina || CSS || — || align=right | 1.4 km || 
|-id=302 bgcolor=#fefefe
| 490302 ||  || — || November 24, 2008 || Mount Lemmon || Mount Lemmon Survey || — || align=right data-sort-value="0.85" | 850 m || 
|-id=303 bgcolor=#d6d6d6
| 490303 ||  || — || January 3, 2009 || Kitt Peak || Spacewatch || — || align=right | 2.2 km || 
|-id=304 bgcolor=#fefefe
| 490304 ||  || — || January 2, 2009 || Kitt Peak || Spacewatch || MAS || align=right data-sort-value="0.65" | 650 m || 
|-id=305 bgcolor=#E9E9E9
| 490305 ||  || — || January 1, 2009 || Mount Lemmon || Mount Lemmon Survey || — || align=right | 1.3 km || 
|-id=306 bgcolor=#E9E9E9
| 490306 ||  || — || December 29, 2008 || Kitt Peak || Spacewatch || — || align=right | 1.1 km || 
|-id=307 bgcolor=#d6d6d6
| 490307 ||  || — || January 16, 2009 || Kitt Peak || Spacewatch || EOS || align=right | 1.5 km || 
|-id=308 bgcolor=#d6d6d6
| 490308 ||  || — || January 16, 2009 || Kitt Peak || Spacewatch || — || align=right | 2.0 km || 
|-id=309 bgcolor=#fefefe
| 490309 ||  || — || January 16, 2009 || Kitt Peak || Spacewatch || MAS || align=right data-sort-value="0.68" | 680 m || 
|-id=310 bgcolor=#d6d6d6
| 490310 ||  || — || January 16, 2009 || Kitt Peak || Spacewatch || — || align=right | 1.9 km || 
|-id=311 bgcolor=#fefefe
| 490311 ||  || — || January 16, 2009 || Kitt Peak || Spacewatch || — || align=right data-sort-value="0.62" | 620 m || 
|-id=312 bgcolor=#fefefe
| 490312 ||  || — || January 16, 2009 || Kitt Peak || Spacewatch || MAS || align=right data-sort-value="0.63" | 630 m || 
|-id=313 bgcolor=#fefefe
| 490313 ||  || — || January 1, 2009 || Kitt Peak || Spacewatch || H || align=right data-sort-value="0.54" | 540 m || 
|-id=314 bgcolor=#E9E9E9
| 490314 ||  || — || December 29, 2008 || Mount Lemmon || Mount Lemmon Survey || — || align=right | 1.8 km || 
|-id=315 bgcolor=#fefefe
| 490315 ||  || — || December 22, 2008 || Mount Lemmon || Mount Lemmon Survey || NYS || align=right data-sort-value="0.72" | 720 m || 
|-id=316 bgcolor=#fefefe
| 490316 ||  || — || January 20, 2009 || Kitt Peak || Spacewatch || — || align=right data-sort-value="0.71" | 710 m || 
|-id=317 bgcolor=#E9E9E9
| 490317 ||  || — || January 20, 2009 || Kitt Peak || Spacewatch || critical || align=right data-sort-value="0.96" | 960 m || 
|-id=318 bgcolor=#d6d6d6
| 490318 ||  || — || January 16, 2009 || Kitt Peak || Spacewatch || — || align=right | 2.7 km || 
|-id=319 bgcolor=#E9E9E9
| 490319 ||  || — || January 3, 2009 || Mount Lemmon || Mount Lemmon Survey || critical || align=right data-sort-value="0.96" | 960 m || 
|-id=320 bgcolor=#fefefe
| 490320 ||  || — || December 31, 2008 || Kitt Peak || Spacewatch || — || align=right data-sort-value="0.79" | 790 m || 
|-id=321 bgcolor=#E9E9E9
| 490321 ||  || — || January 31, 2009 || Socorro || LINEAR || — || align=right | 1.2 km || 
|-id=322 bgcolor=#fefefe
| 490322 ||  || — || January 2, 2009 || Mount Lemmon || Mount Lemmon Survey || NYS || align=right data-sort-value="0.57" | 570 m || 
|-id=323 bgcolor=#d6d6d6
| 490323 ||  || — || December 21, 2008 || Kitt Peak || Spacewatch || — || align=right | 1.8 km || 
|-id=324 bgcolor=#E9E9E9
| 490324 ||  || — || January 20, 2009 || Kitt Peak || Spacewatch || — || align=right | 1.3 km || 
|-id=325 bgcolor=#d6d6d6
| 490325 ||  || — || January 31, 2009 || Kitt Peak || Spacewatch || KOR || align=right | 1.1 km || 
|-id=326 bgcolor=#fefefe
| 490326 ||  || — || January 16, 2009 || Kitt Peak || Spacewatch || — || align=right data-sort-value="0.70" | 700 m || 
|-id=327 bgcolor=#fefefe
| 490327 ||  || — || January 31, 2009 || Kitt Peak || Spacewatch || — || align=right data-sort-value="0.68" | 680 m || 
|-id=328 bgcolor=#fefefe
| 490328 ||  || — || January 31, 2009 || Mount Lemmon || Mount Lemmon Survey || — || align=right data-sort-value="0.78" | 780 m || 
|-id=329 bgcolor=#E9E9E9
| 490329 ||  || — || January 25, 2009 || Kitt Peak || Spacewatch || — || align=right data-sort-value="0.78" | 780 m || 
|-id=330 bgcolor=#fefefe
| 490330 ||  || — || January 16, 2005 || Kitt Peak || Spacewatch || — || align=right data-sort-value="0.62" | 620 m || 
|-id=331 bgcolor=#fefefe
| 490331 ||  || — || January 17, 2009 || Kitt Peak || Spacewatch || MAS || align=right data-sort-value="0.59" | 590 m || 
|-id=332 bgcolor=#FA8072
| 490332 ||  || — || January 22, 2009 || Socorro || LINEAR || H || align=right data-sort-value="0.68" | 680 m || 
|-id=333 bgcolor=#d6d6d6
| 490333 ||  || — || January 25, 2009 || Kitt Peak || Spacewatch || — || align=right | 2.5 km || 
|-id=334 bgcolor=#fefefe
| 490334 ||  || — || December 29, 2008 || Catalina || CSS || H || align=right data-sort-value="0.71" | 710 m || 
|-id=335 bgcolor=#d6d6d6
| 490335 ||  || — || October 11, 2007 || Kitt Peak || Spacewatch || — || align=right | 1.9 km || 
|-id=336 bgcolor=#E9E9E9
| 490336 ||  || — || February 2, 2009 || Mount Lemmon || Mount Lemmon Survey || — || align=right | 1.0 km || 
|-id=337 bgcolor=#d6d6d6
| 490337 ||  || — || December 30, 2008 || Mount Lemmon || Mount Lemmon Survey || — || align=right | 2.8 km || 
|-id=338 bgcolor=#fefefe
| 490338 ||  || — || February 22, 2009 || Calar Alto || F. Hormuth || — || align=right data-sort-value="0.78" | 780 m || 
|-id=339 bgcolor=#d6d6d6
| 490339 ||  || — || September 25, 2006 || Kitt Peak || Spacewatch || — || align=right | 2.4 km || 
|-id=340 bgcolor=#E9E9E9
| 490340 ||  || — || February 19, 2009 || Kitt Peak || Spacewatch || — || align=right | 1.9 km || 
|-id=341 bgcolor=#fefefe
| 490341 ||  || — || February 22, 2009 || Kitt Peak || Spacewatch || — || align=right data-sort-value="0.71" | 710 m || 
|-id=342 bgcolor=#E9E9E9
| 490342 ||  || — || February 21, 2009 || Mount Lemmon || Mount Lemmon Survey || — || align=right data-sort-value="0.65" | 650 m || 
|-id=343 bgcolor=#d6d6d6
| 490343 ||  || — || January 20, 2009 || Kitt Peak || Spacewatch || — || align=right | 1.8 km || 
|-id=344 bgcolor=#E9E9E9
| 490344 ||  || — || February 3, 2009 || Mount Lemmon || Mount Lemmon Survey || (5) || align=right data-sort-value="0.72" | 720 m || 
|-id=345 bgcolor=#E9E9E9
| 490345 ||  || — || February 26, 2009 || Mount Lemmon || Mount Lemmon Survey || — || align=right data-sort-value="0.68" | 680 m || 
|-id=346 bgcolor=#E9E9E9
| 490346 ||  || — || February 19, 2009 || La Sagra || OAM Obs. || — || align=right | 2.3 km || 
|-id=347 bgcolor=#d6d6d6
| 490347 ||  || — || January 31, 2009 || Kitt Peak || Spacewatch || — || align=right | 2.5 km || 
|-id=348 bgcolor=#d6d6d6
| 490348 ||  || — || February 17, 2009 || La Sagra || OAM Obs. || — || align=right | 2.8 km || 
|-id=349 bgcolor=#fefefe
| 490349 ||  || — || February 22, 2009 || Kitt Peak || Spacewatch || H || align=right data-sort-value="0.49" | 490 m || 
|-id=350 bgcolor=#d6d6d6
| 490350 ||  || — || March 1, 2009 || Kitt Peak || Spacewatch || — || align=right | 2.6 km || 
|-id=351 bgcolor=#d6d6d6
| 490351 ||  || — || March 2, 2009 || Kitt Peak || Spacewatch || — || align=right | 1.8 km || 
|-id=352 bgcolor=#E9E9E9
| 490352 ||  || — || March 2, 2009 || Socorro || LINEAR || — || align=right | 2.8 km || 
|-id=353 bgcolor=#fefefe
| 490353 ||  || — || January 19, 2009 || Mount Lemmon || Mount Lemmon Survey || — || align=right data-sort-value="0.78" | 780 m || 
|-id=354 bgcolor=#FFC2E0
| 490354 ||  || — || March 21, 2009 || Mount Lemmon || Mount Lemmon Survey || APOPHA || align=right data-sort-value="0.19" | 190 m || 
|-id=355 bgcolor=#d6d6d6
| 490355 ||  || — || March 18, 2009 || Catalina || CSS || — || align=right | 3.6 km || 
|-id=356 bgcolor=#E9E9E9
| 490356 ||  || — || March 30, 2009 || Sierra Stars || F. Tozzi || — || align=right data-sort-value="0.87" | 870 m || 
|-id=357 bgcolor=#fefefe
| 490357 ||  || — || January 18, 2009 || Mount Lemmon || Mount Lemmon Survey || H || align=right data-sort-value="0.77" | 770 m || 
|-id=358 bgcolor=#fefefe
| 490358 ||  || — || March 28, 2009 || Kitt Peak || Spacewatch || H || align=right data-sort-value="0.74" | 740 m || 
|-id=359 bgcolor=#fefefe
| 490359 ||  || — || March 18, 2009 || Mount Lemmon || Mount Lemmon Survey || — || align=right data-sort-value="0.57" | 570 m || 
|-id=360 bgcolor=#E9E9E9
| 490360 ||  || — || March 17, 2009 || Kitt Peak || Spacewatch || EUN || align=right data-sort-value="0.98" | 980 m || 
|-id=361 bgcolor=#E9E9E9
| 490361 ||  || — || April 18, 2009 || Kitt Peak || Spacewatch || — || align=right data-sort-value="0.85" | 850 m || 
|-id=362 bgcolor=#E9E9E9
| 490362 ||  || — || April 18, 2009 || Kitt Peak || Spacewatch || — || align=right data-sort-value="0.77" | 770 m || 
|-id=363 bgcolor=#E9E9E9
| 490363 ||  || — || December 30, 2007 || Kitt Peak || Spacewatch || — || align=right | 1.0 km || 
|-id=364 bgcolor=#E9E9E9
| 490364 ||  || — || April 20, 2009 || Mount Lemmon || Mount Lemmon Survey || KON || align=right | 1.8 km || 
|-id=365 bgcolor=#E9E9E9
| 490365 ||  || — || March 17, 2009 || Kitt Peak || Spacewatch || — || align=right data-sort-value="0.99" | 990 m || 
|-id=366 bgcolor=#E9E9E9
| 490366 ||  || — || October 20, 2006 || Kitt Peak || Spacewatch || — || align=right | 1.1 km || 
|-id=367 bgcolor=#E9E9E9
| 490367 ||  || — || April 17, 2009 || Kitt Peak || Spacewatch || — || align=right | 1.5 km || 
|-id=368 bgcolor=#E9E9E9
| 490368 ||  || — || February 27, 2009 || Mount Lemmon || Mount Lemmon Survey || EUN || align=right | 1.0 km || 
|-id=369 bgcolor=#fefefe
| 490369 ||  || — || March 29, 2009 || Catalina || CSS || H || align=right data-sort-value="0.71" | 710 m || 
|-id=370 bgcolor=#fefefe
| 490370 ||  || — || April 27, 2009 || Mount Lemmon || Mount Lemmon Survey || H || align=right data-sort-value="0.75" | 750 m || 
|-id=371 bgcolor=#E9E9E9
| 490371 ||  || — || April 23, 2009 || Kitt Peak || Spacewatch || EUN || align=right | 1.1 km || 
|-id=372 bgcolor=#fefefe
| 490372 ||  || — || April 23, 2009 || Mount Lemmon || Mount Lemmon Survey || H || align=right data-sort-value="0.62" | 620 m || 
|-id=373 bgcolor=#E9E9E9
| 490373 ||  || — || May 13, 2009 || Mount Lemmon || Mount Lemmon Survey || EUN || align=right | 1.1 km || 
|-id=374 bgcolor=#fefefe
| 490374 ||  || — || May 14, 2009 || Kitt Peak || Spacewatch || H || align=right data-sort-value="0.66" | 660 m || 
|-id=375 bgcolor=#E9E9E9
| 490375 ||  || — || May 1, 2009 || Mount Lemmon || Mount Lemmon Survey || — || align=right data-sort-value="0.91" | 910 m || 
|-id=376 bgcolor=#E9E9E9
| 490376 ||  || — || May 1, 2009 || Mount Lemmon || Mount Lemmon Survey || — || align=right data-sort-value="0.96" | 960 m || 
|-id=377 bgcolor=#fefefe
| 490377 ||  || — || May 2, 2009 || La Sagra || OAM Obs. || — || align=right data-sort-value="0.69" | 690 m || 
|-id=378 bgcolor=#E9E9E9
| 490378 ||  || — || May 15, 2009 || Kitt Peak || Spacewatch || — || align=right data-sort-value="0.78" | 780 m || 
|-id=379 bgcolor=#E9E9E9
| 490379 ||  || — || May 1, 2009 || Kitt Peak || Spacewatch || — || align=right data-sort-value="0.91" | 910 m || 
|-id=380 bgcolor=#E9E9E9
| 490380 ||  || — || April 23, 2009 || Mount Lemmon || Mount Lemmon Survey || — || align=right data-sort-value="0.83" | 830 m || 
|-id=381 bgcolor=#E9E9E9
| 490381 ||  || — || July 29, 2009 || La Sagra || OAM Obs. || — || align=right | 1.5 km || 
|-id=382 bgcolor=#d6d6d6
| 490382 ||  || — || July 28, 2009 || La Sagra || OAM Obs. || — || align=right | 3.8 km || 
|-id=383 bgcolor=#E9E9E9
| 490383 ||  || — || July 28, 2009 || La Sagra || OAM Obs. || — || align=right | 2.7 km || 
|-id=384 bgcolor=#E9E9E9
| 490384 ||  || — || July 27, 2009 || Kitt Peak || Spacewatch || EUN || align=right | 1.2 km || 
|-id=385 bgcolor=#FA8072
| 490385 ||  || — || August 13, 2009 || La Sagra || OAM Obs. || — || align=right data-sort-value="0.64" | 640 m || 
|-id=386 bgcolor=#E9E9E9
| 490386 ||  || — || August 15, 2009 || Altschwendt || W. Ries || — || align=right | 1.9 km || 
|-id=387 bgcolor=#E9E9E9
| 490387 ||  || — || September 29, 2005 || Mount Lemmon || Mount Lemmon Survey || — || align=right | 1.5 km || 
|-id=388 bgcolor=#fefefe
| 490388 ||  || — || August 15, 2009 || Kitt Peak || Spacewatch || — || align=right data-sort-value="0.65" | 650 m || 
|-id=389 bgcolor=#fefefe
| 490389 ||  || — || August 16, 2009 || La Sagra || OAM Obs. || H || align=right data-sort-value="0.85" | 850 m || 
|-id=390 bgcolor=#fefefe
| 490390 ||  || — || August 16, 2009 || La Sagra || OAM Obs. || — || align=right data-sort-value="0.74" | 740 m || 
|-id=391 bgcolor=#E9E9E9
| 490391 ||  || — || August 18, 2009 || Bergisch Gladbach || W. Bickel || — || align=right | 1.5 km || 
|-id=392 bgcolor=#fefefe
| 490392 ||  || — || August 16, 2009 || Kitt Peak || Spacewatch || — || align=right data-sort-value="0.80" | 800 m || 
|-id=393 bgcolor=#E9E9E9
| 490393 ||  || — || August 16, 2009 || Kitt Peak || Spacewatch || — || align=right | 1.4 km || 
|-id=394 bgcolor=#E9E9E9
| 490394 ||  || — || August 19, 2009 || La Sagra || OAM Obs. || — || align=right | 1.5 km || 
|-id=395 bgcolor=#E9E9E9
| 490395 ||  || — || August 16, 2009 || La Sagra || OAM Obs. || ADE || align=right | 2.3 km || 
|-id=396 bgcolor=#E9E9E9
| 490396 ||  || — || August 17, 2009 || La Sagra || OAM Obs. || — || align=right | 2.0 km || 
|-id=397 bgcolor=#d6d6d6
| 490397 ||  || — || August 16, 2001 || Socorro || LINEAR || 3:2 || align=right | 4.5 km || 
|-id=398 bgcolor=#E9E9E9
| 490398 ||  || — || August 17, 2009 || La Sagra || OAM Obs. || — || align=right | 2.4 km || 
|-id=399 bgcolor=#E9E9E9
| 490399 ||  || — || August 26, 2009 || Socorro || LINEAR || — || align=right | 2.8 km || 
|-id=400 bgcolor=#E9E9E9
| 490400 ||  || — || September 1, 2009 || La Sagra || OAM Obs. || — || align=right | 1.9 km || 
|}

490401–490500 

|-bgcolor=#E9E9E9
| 490401 ||  || — || September 10, 2009 || ESA OGS || ESA OGS || AEO || align=right | 1.0 km || 
|-id=402 bgcolor=#d6d6d6
| 490402 ||  || — || September 12, 2009 || Kitt Peak || Spacewatch || KOR || align=right | 1.2 km || 
|-id=403 bgcolor=#d6d6d6
| 490403 ||  || — || September 14, 2009 || Kitt Peak || Spacewatch || — || align=right | 3.3 km || 
|-id=404 bgcolor=#C2FFFF
| 490404 ||  || — || September 14, 2009 || Kitt Peak || Spacewatch || L4 || align=right | 6.1 km || 
|-id=405 bgcolor=#d6d6d6
| 490405 ||  || — || September 14, 2009 || Kitt Peak || Spacewatch || — || align=right | 2.5 km || 
|-id=406 bgcolor=#d6d6d6
| 490406 ||  || — || September 15, 2009 || Kitt Peak || Spacewatch || — || align=right | 2.4 km || 
|-id=407 bgcolor=#d6d6d6
| 490407 ||  || — || September 15, 2009 || Kitt Peak || Spacewatch || — || align=right | 2.5 km || 
|-id=408 bgcolor=#d6d6d6
| 490408 ||  || — || September 15, 2009 || Kitt Peak || Spacewatch || — || align=right | 2.5 km || 
|-id=409 bgcolor=#fefefe
| 490409 ||  || — || September 15, 2009 || Kitt Peak || Spacewatch || — || align=right data-sort-value="0.51" | 510 m || 
|-id=410 bgcolor=#d6d6d6
| 490410 ||  || — || September 10, 2009 || Catalina || CSS || — || align=right | 3.1 km || 
|-id=411 bgcolor=#d6d6d6
| 490411 ||  || — || September 15, 2009 || Kitt Peak || Spacewatch || Tj (2.98) || align=right | 2.9 km || 
|-id=412 bgcolor=#E9E9E9
| 490412 ||  || — || September 18, 2009 || Bisei SG Center || BATTeRS || — || align=right | 1.4 km || 
|-id=413 bgcolor=#E9E9E9
| 490413 ||  || — || September 16, 2009 || Mount Lemmon || Mount Lemmon Survey || — || align=right | 1.9 km || 
|-id=414 bgcolor=#d6d6d6
| 490414 ||  || — || September 16, 2009 || Kitt Peak || Spacewatch || EOS || align=right | 1.8 km || 
|-id=415 bgcolor=#C2FFFF
| 490415 ||  || — || September 16, 2009 || Kitt Peak || Spacewatch || L4 || align=right | 7.3 km || 
|-id=416 bgcolor=#d6d6d6
| 490416 ||  || — || September 16, 2009 || Kitt Peak || Spacewatch || — || align=right | 2.6 km || 
|-id=417 bgcolor=#d6d6d6
| 490417 ||  || — || September 16, 2009 || Kitt Peak || Spacewatch || — || align=right | 3.1 km || 
|-id=418 bgcolor=#C2FFFF
| 490418 ||  || — || September 16, 2009 || Kitt Peak || Spacewatch || L4 || align=right | 7.1 km || 
|-id=419 bgcolor=#E9E9E9
| 490419 ||  || — || September 16, 2009 || Kitt Peak || Spacewatch || KON || align=right | 2.0 km || 
|-id=420 bgcolor=#d6d6d6
| 490420 ||  || — || September 14, 2009 || Socorro || LINEAR || — || align=right | 3.0 km || 
|-id=421 bgcolor=#fefefe
| 490421 ||  || — || September 17, 2009 || Kitt Peak || Spacewatch || — || align=right data-sort-value="0.59" | 590 m || 
|-id=422 bgcolor=#d6d6d6
| 490422 ||  || — || September 17, 2009 || Kitt Peak || Spacewatch || — || align=right | 2.5 km || 
|-id=423 bgcolor=#fefefe
| 490423 ||  || — || September 17, 2009 || Kitt Peak || Spacewatch || — || align=right data-sort-value="0.51" | 510 m || 
|-id=424 bgcolor=#E9E9E9
| 490424 ||  || — || September 17, 2009 || Kitt Peak || Spacewatch || EUN || align=right data-sort-value="0.88" | 880 m || 
|-id=425 bgcolor=#d6d6d6
| 490425 ||  || — || September 17, 2009 || Mount Lemmon || Mount Lemmon Survey || — || align=right | 2.0 km || 
|-id=426 bgcolor=#fefefe
| 490426 ||  || — || August 29, 2009 || Kitt Peak || Spacewatch || — || align=right data-sort-value="0.53" | 530 m || 
|-id=427 bgcolor=#d6d6d6
| 490427 ||  || — || September 17, 2009 || Kitt Peak || Spacewatch || — || align=right | 2.3 km || 
|-id=428 bgcolor=#E9E9E9
| 490428 ||  || — || September 17, 2009 || Kitt Peak || Spacewatch || — || align=right | 1.8 km || 
|-id=429 bgcolor=#d6d6d6
| 490429 ||  || — || September 17, 2009 || Kitt Peak || Spacewatch || — || align=right | 2.7 km || 
|-id=430 bgcolor=#E9E9E9
| 490430 ||  || — || August 16, 2009 || Kitt Peak || Spacewatch || (5) || align=right data-sort-value="0.66" | 660 m || 
|-id=431 bgcolor=#E9E9E9
| 490431 ||  || — || September 18, 2009 || Kitt Peak || Spacewatch || — || align=right | 1.7 km || 
|-id=432 bgcolor=#d6d6d6
| 490432 ||  || — || September 19, 2009 || Mount Lemmon || Mount Lemmon Survey || — || align=right | 2.5 km || 
|-id=433 bgcolor=#d6d6d6
| 490433 ||  || — || September 16, 2009 || Kitt Peak || Spacewatch || — || align=right | 2.6 km || 
|-id=434 bgcolor=#fefefe
| 490434 ||  || — || September 16, 2009 || Kitt Peak || Spacewatch || CLA || align=right | 1.6 km || 
|-id=435 bgcolor=#E9E9E9
| 490435 ||  || — || September 18, 2009 || Kitt Peak || Spacewatch || MRX || align=right | 1.0 km || 
|-id=436 bgcolor=#E9E9E9
| 490436 ||  || — || September 18, 2009 || Kitt Peak || Spacewatch || — || align=right | 1.7 km || 
|-id=437 bgcolor=#d6d6d6
| 490437 ||  || — || September 18, 2009 || Kitt Peak || Spacewatch || — || align=right | 2.3 km || 
|-id=438 bgcolor=#d6d6d6
| 490438 ||  || — || September 18, 2009 || Kitt Peak || Spacewatch || — || align=right | 2.4 km || 
|-id=439 bgcolor=#fefefe
| 490439 ||  || — || September 18, 2009 || Kitt Peak || Spacewatch || critical || align=right data-sort-value="0.47" | 470 m || 
|-id=440 bgcolor=#d6d6d6
| 490440 ||  || — || September 18, 2009 || Kitt Peak || Spacewatch || — || align=right | 2.7 km || 
|-id=441 bgcolor=#fefefe
| 490441 ||  || — || September 18, 2009 || Kitt Peak || Spacewatch || NYS || align=right data-sort-value="0.60" | 600 m || 
|-id=442 bgcolor=#fefefe
| 490442 ||  || — || September 19, 2009 || Mount Lemmon || Mount Lemmon Survey || — || align=right data-sort-value="0.57" | 570 m || 
|-id=443 bgcolor=#fefefe
| 490443 ||  || — || September 19, 2009 || Kitt Peak || Spacewatch || — || align=right data-sort-value="0.63" | 630 m || 
|-id=444 bgcolor=#d6d6d6
| 490444 ||  || — || September 20, 2009 || Kitt Peak || Spacewatch || EOS || align=right | 1.7 km || 
|-id=445 bgcolor=#d6d6d6
| 490445 ||  || — || September 20, 2009 || Kitt Peak || Spacewatch || — || align=right | 3.7 km || 
|-id=446 bgcolor=#C2FFFF
| 490446 ||  || — || September 21, 2009 || Kitt Peak || Spacewatch || L4 || align=right | 7.0 km || 
|-id=447 bgcolor=#d6d6d6
| 490447 ||  || — || September 22, 2009 || Kitt Peak || Spacewatch || LIX || align=right | 2.8 km || 
|-id=448 bgcolor=#C2FFFF
| 490448 ||  || — || September 21, 2009 || Kitt Peak || Spacewatch || L4 || align=right | 6.9 km || 
|-id=449 bgcolor=#E9E9E9
| 490449 ||  || — || September 14, 2009 || Kitt Peak || Spacewatch || DOR || align=right | 2.4 km || 
|-id=450 bgcolor=#d6d6d6
| 490450 ||  || — || September 18, 2009 || Kitt Peak || Spacewatch || — || align=right | 2.7 km || 
|-id=451 bgcolor=#d6d6d6
| 490451 ||  || — || September 22, 2009 || Kitt Peak || Spacewatch || — || align=right | 3.4 km || 
|-id=452 bgcolor=#d6d6d6
| 490452 ||  || — || September 18, 2009 || Kitt Peak || Spacewatch || — || align=right | 3.0 km || 
|-id=453 bgcolor=#fefefe
| 490453 ||  || — || September 23, 2009 || Kitt Peak || Spacewatch || — || align=right data-sort-value="0.56" | 560 m || 
|-id=454 bgcolor=#fefefe
| 490454 ||  || — || September 15, 2009 || Kitt Peak || Spacewatch || — || align=right data-sort-value="0.56" | 560 m || 
|-id=455 bgcolor=#fefefe
| 490455 ||  || — || September 23, 2009 || Kitt Peak || Spacewatch || — || align=right data-sort-value="0.61" | 610 m || 
|-id=456 bgcolor=#d6d6d6
| 490456 ||  || — || August 31, 2009 || Siding Spring || SSS || — || align=right | 4.0 km || 
|-id=457 bgcolor=#fefefe
| 490457 ||  || — || September 19, 2009 || Kitt Peak || Spacewatch || — || align=right data-sort-value="0.78" | 780 m || 
|-id=458 bgcolor=#E9E9E9
| 490458 ||  || — || October 29, 2005 || Catalina || CSS || — || align=right data-sort-value="0.82" | 820 m || 
|-id=459 bgcolor=#fefefe
| 490459 ||  || — || September 23, 2009 || Mount Lemmon || Mount Lemmon Survey || — || align=right data-sort-value="0.83" | 830 m || 
|-id=460 bgcolor=#d6d6d6
| 490460 ||  || — || January 30, 2000 || Kitt Peak || Spacewatch || VER || align=right | 6.1 km || 
|-id=461 bgcolor=#d6d6d6
| 490461 ||  || — || September 20, 2009 || Kitt Peak || Spacewatch || — || align=right | 2.6 km || 
|-id=462 bgcolor=#d6d6d6
| 490462 ||  || — || September 24, 2009 || Kitt Peak || Spacewatch || — || align=right | 2.5 km || 
|-id=463 bgcolor=#fefefe
| 490463 ||  || — || September 25, 2009 || Kitt Peak || Spacewatch || — || align=right data-sort-value="0.55" | 550 m || 
|-id=464 bgcolor=#d6d6d6
| 490464 ||  || — || September 25, 2009 || Kitt Peak || Spacewatch || EOS || align=right | 1.7 km || 
|-id=465 bgcolor=#d6d6d6
| 490465 ||  || — || September 25, 2009 || Kitt Peak || Spacewatch || — || align=right | 1.9 km || 
|-id=466 bgcolor=#d6d6d6
| 490466 ||  || — || September 25, 2009 || Kitt Peak || Spacewatch || NAE || align=right | 3.2 km || 
|-id=467 bgcolor=#fefefe
| 490467 ||  || — || September 17, 2009 || Kitt Peak || Spacewatch || — || align=right data-sort-value="0.61" | 610 m || 
|-id=468 bgcolor=#d6d6d6
| 490468 ||  || — || September 17, 2009 || Kitt Peak || Spacewatch || THB || align=right | 2.6 km || 
|-id=469 bgcolor=#fefefe
| 490469 ||  || — || September 26, 2009 || Kitt Peak || Spacewatch || (2076) || align=right data-sort-value="0.68" | 680 m || 
|-id=470 bgcolor=#d6d6d6
| 490470 ||  || — || September 16, 2009 || Kitt Peak || Spacewatch || — || align=right | 2.3 km || 
|-id=471 bgcolor=#d6d6d6
| 490471 ||  || — || September 21, 2009 || Kitt Peak || Spacewatch || — || align=right | 2.5 km || 
|-id=472 bgcolor=#d6d6d6
| 490472 ||  || — || September 23, 2009 || Kitt Peak || Spacewatch || — || align=right | 2.4 km || 
|-id=473 bgcolor=#fefefe
| 490473 ||  || — || September 24, 2009 || Kitt Peak || Spacewatch || — || align=right data-sort-value="0.65" | 650 m || 
|-id=474 bgcolor=#E9E9E9
| 490474 ||  || — || September 29, 2009 || Mount Lemmon || Mount Lemmon Survey || — || align=right | 2.8 km || 
|-id=475 bgcolor=#E9E9E9
| 490475 ||  || — || September 18, 2009 || Kitt Peak || Spacewatch || — || align=right | 1.2 km || 
|-id=476 bgcolor=#E9E9E9
| 490476 ||  || — || September 18, 2009 || Kitt Peak || Spacewatch || — || align=right data-sort-value="0.91" | 910 m || 
|-id=477 bgcolor=#d6d6d6
| 490477 ||  || — || September 19, 2009 || Kitt Peak || Spacewatch || — || align=right | 2.3 km || 
|-id=478 bgcolor=#d6d6d6
| 490478 ||  || — || September 23, 2009 || Mount Lemmon || Mount Lemmon Survey || — || align=right | 3.3 km || 
|-id=479 bgcolor=#E9E9E9
| 490479 ||  || — || September 25, 2009 || Kitt Peak || Spacewatch || — || align=right | 2.2 km || 
|-id=480 bgcolor=#E9E9E9
| 490480 ||  || — || September 28, 2009 || Mount Lemmon || Mount Lemmon Survey || — || align=right | 2.8 km || 
|-id=481 bgcolor=#d6d6d6
| 490481 ||  || — || September 16, 2009 || Kitt Peak || Spacewatch || EOS || align=right | 1.6 km || 
|-id=482 bgcolor=#d6d6d6
| 490482 ||  || — || September 18, 2009 || Kitt Peak || Spacewatch || — || align=right | 2.4 km || 
|-id=483 bgcolor=#E9E9E9
| 490483 ||  || — || September 16, 2009 || Kitt Peak || Spacewatch || — || align=right | 1.3 km || 
|-id=484 bgcolor=#d6d6d6
| 490484 ||  || — || September 25, 2009 || Kitt Peak || Spacewatch || Tj (2.92) || align=right | 3.7 km || 
|-id=485 bgcolor=#d6d6d6
| 490485 ||  || — || September 28, 2009 || Catalina || CSS || — || align=right | 3.3 km || 
|-id=486 bgcolor=#d6d6d6
| 490486 ||  || — || September 21, 2009 || Mount Lemmon || Mount Lemmon Survey || — || align=right | 2.6 km || 
|-id=487 bgcolor=#E9E9E9
| 490487 ||  || — || October 11, 2009 || La Sagra || OAM Obs. || — || align=right | 1.1 km || 
|-id=488 bgcolor=#E9E9E9
| 490488 ||  || — || October 12, 2009 || La Sagra || OAM Obs. || — || align=right | 2.6 km || 
|-id=489 bgcolor=#d6d6d6
| 490489 ||  || — || October 13, 2009 || La Sagra || OAM Obs. || — || align=right | 3.3 km || 
|-id=490 bgcolor=#d6d6d6
| 490490 ||  || — || September 17, 2009 || La Sagra || OAM Obs. || — || align=right | 1.7 km || 
|-id=491 bgcolor=#fefefe
| 490491 ||  || — || October 15, 2009 || Catalina || CSS || critical || align=right data-sort-value="0.71" | 710 m || 
|-id=492 bgcolor=#fefefe
| 490492 ||  || — || October 17, 2009 || La Sagra || OAM Obs. || — || align=right | 2.1 km || 
|-id=493 bgcolor=#fefefe
| 490493 ||  || — || September 21, 2009 || Catalina || CSS || — || align=right data-sort-value="0.68" | 680 m || 
|-id=494 bgcolor=#fefefe
| 490494 ||  || — || October 18, 2009 || Mount Lemmon || Mount Lemmon Survey || — || align=right data-sort-value="0.61" | 610 m || 
|-id=495 bgcolor=#d6d6d6
| 490495 ||  || — || October 17, 2009 || Mount Lemmon || Mount Lemmon Survey || — || align=right | 2.3 km || 
|-id=496 bgcolor=#fefefe
| 490496 ||  || — || September 29, 2009 || Mount Lemmon || Mount Lemmon Survey || — || align=right data-sort-value="0.53" | 530 m || 
|-id=497 bgcolor=#fefefe
| 490497 ||  || — || September 16, 2009 || Mount Lemmon || Mount Lemmon Survey || — || align=right | 1.3 km || 
|-id=498 bgcolor=#fefefe
| 490498 ||  || — || October 18, 2009 || Mount Lemmon || Mount Lemmon Survey || — || align=right data-sort-value="0.52" | 520 m || 
|-id=499 bgcolor=#d6d6d6
| 490499 ||  || — || October 21, 2009 || Kitt Peak || Spacewatch || — || align=right | 2.4 km || 
|-id=500 bgcolor=#fefefe
| 490500 ||  || — || October 23, 1995 || Kitt Peak || Spacewatch || critical || align=right data-sort-value="0.59" | 590 m || 
|}

490501–490600 

|-bgcolor=#d6d6d6
| 490501 ||  || — || September 22, 2009 || Mount Lemmon || Mount Lemmon Survey || — || align=right | 2.1 km || 
|-id=502 bgcolor=#d6d6d6
| 490502 ||  || — || September 22, 2009 || Mount Lemmon || Mount Lemmon Survey || — || align=right | 3.7 km || 
|-id=503 bgcolor=#fefefe
| 490503 ||  || — || September 22, 2009 || Mount Lemmon || Mount Lemmon Survey || — || align=right data-sort-value="0.52" | 520 m || 
|-id=504 bgcolor=#d6d6d6
| 490504 ||  || — || October 22, 2009 || Mount Lemmon || Mount Lemmon Survey || — || align=right | 2.8 km || 
|-id=505 bgcolor=#E9E9E9
| 490505 ||  || — || September 21, 2009 || Mount Lemmon || Mount Lemmon Survey || — || align=right | 1.9 km || 
|-id=506 bgcolor=#d6d6d6
| 490506 ||  || — || October 17, 2009 || Mount Lemmon || Mount Lemmon Survey || EOS || align=right | 1.4 km || 
|-id=507 bgcolor=#d6d6d6
| 490507 ||  || — || August 16, 2009 || Kitt Peak || Spacewatch || — || align=right | 2.5 km || 
|-id=508 bgcolor=#d6d6d6
| 490508 ||  || — || October 11, 2009 || La Sagra || OAM Obs. || — || align=right | 4.0 km || 
|-id=509 bgcolor=#d6d6d6
| 490509 ||  || — || September 14, 2009 || Kitt Peak || Spacewatch || — || align=right | 3.3 km || 
|-id=510 bgcolor=#fefefe
| 490510 ||  || — || October 23, 2009 || Mount Lemmon || Mount Lemmon Survey || — || align=right data-sort-value="0.72" | 720 m || 
|-id=511 bgcolor=#E9E9E9
| 490511 ||  || — || October 23, 2009 || Mount Lemmon || Mount Lemmon Survey || — || align=right | 1.4 km || 
|-id=512 bgcolor=#fefefe
| 490512 ||  || — || September 16, 2009 || Mount Lemmon || Mount Lemmon Survey || — || align=right data-sort-value="0.62" | 620 m || 
|-id=513 bgcolor=#d6d6d6
| 490513 ||  || — || October 23, 2009 || Mount Lemmon || Mount Lemmon Survey || EOS || align=right | 1.5 km || 
|-id=514 bgcolor=#d6d6d6
| 490514 ||  || — || September 18, 2009 || Mount Lemmon || Mount Lemmon Survey || EOS || align=right | 1.4 km || 
|-id=515 bgcolor=#d6d6d6
| 490515 ||  || — || October 25, 2009 || Mount Lemmon || Mount Lemmon Survey || — || align=right | 2.8 km || 
|-id=516 bgcolor=#d6d6d6
| 490516 ||  || — || October 23, 2009 || Kitt Peak || Spacewatch || — || align=right | 4.0 km || 
|-id=517 bgcolor=#d6d6d6
| 490517 ||  || — || October 22, 2009 || Mount Lemmon || Mount Lemmon Survey || — || align=right | 2.8 km || 
|-id=518 bgcolor=#d6d6d6
| 490518 ||  || — || September 18, 2009 || Kitt Peak || Spacewatch || — || align=right | 2.1 km || 
|-id=519 bgcolor=#d6d6d6
| 490519 ||  || — || September 21, 2009 || Mount Lemmon || Mount Lemmon Survey || — || align=right | 2.6 km || 
|-id=520 bgcolor=#d6d6d6
| 490520 ||  || — || October 15, 2009 || La Sagra || OAM Obs. || — || align=right | 3.4 km || 
|-id=521 bgcolor=#d6d6d6
| 490521 ||  || — || September 20, 2009 || Kitt Peak || Spacewatch || — || align=right | 2.6 km || 
|-id=522 bgcolor=#d6d6d6
| 490522 ||  || — || October 1, 2009 || Mount Lemmon || Mount Lemmon Survey || — || align=right | 2.8 km || 
|-id=523 bgcolor=#d6d6d6
| 490523 ||  || — || October 17, 2009 || Catalina || CSS || — || align=right | 2.1 km || 
|-id=524 bgcolor=#fefefe
| 490524 ||  || — || October 27, 2009 || La Sagra || OAM Obs. || — || align=right data-sort-value="0.85" | 850 m || 
|-id=525 bgcolor=#d6d6d6
| 490525 ||  || — || October 24, 2009 || Catalina || CSS || Tj (2.99) || align=right | 3.6 km || 
|-id=526 bgcolor=#d6d6d6
| 490526 ||  || — || October 18, 2009 || Mount Lemmon || Mount Lemmon Survey || — || align=right | 2.4 km || 
|-id=527 bgcolor=#E9E9E9
| 490527 ||  || — || October 23, 2009 || Mount Lemmon || Mount Lemmon Survey || — || align=right | 3.1 km || 
|-id=528 bgcolor=#d6d6d6
| 490528 ||  || — || October 14, 2009 || La Sagra || OAM Obs. || — || align=right | 2.7 km || 
|-id=529 bgcolor=#E9E9E9
| 490529 ||  || — || November 6, 2009 || Great Shefford || P. Birtwhistle || — || align=right | 3.2 km || 
|-id=530 bgcolor=#fefefe
| 490530 ||  || — || October 30, 2009 || Mount Lemmon || Mount Lemmon Survey || — || align=right data-sort-value="0.69" | 690 m || 
|-id=531 bgcolor=#E9E9E9
| 490531 ||  || — || October 24, 2009 || Catalina || CSS || — || align=right | 1.4 km || 
|-id=532 bgcolor=#fefefe
| 490532 ||  || — || November 9, 2009 || Kitt Peak || Spacewatch || — || align=right | 1.5 km || 
|-id=533 bgcolor=#d6d6d6
| 490533 ||  || — || October 14, 2009 || Catalina || CSS || — || align=right | 3.3 km || 
|-id=534 bgcolor=#d6d6d6
| 490534 ||  || — || November 8, 2009 || Catalina || CSS || — || align=right | 3.9 km || 
|-id=535 bgcolor=#fefefe
| 490535 ||  || — || November 9, 2009 || Catalina || CSS || — || align=right data-sort-value="0.70" | 700 m || 
|-id=536 bgcolor=#d6d6d6
| 490536 ||  || — || November 9, 2009 || Mount Lemmon || Mount Lemmon Survey || VER || align=right | 2.4 km || 
|-id=537 bgcolor=#d6d6d6
| 490537 ||  || — || October 27, 2009 || Kitt Peak || Spacewatch || — || align=right | 2.8 km || 
|-id=538 bgcolor=#fefefe
| 490538 ||  || — || November 9, 2009 || Kitt Peak || Spacewatch || NYS || align=right data-sort-value="0.58" | 580 m || 
|-id=539 bgcolor=#fefefe
| 490539 ||  || — || October 25, 2009 || Catalina || CSS || — || align=right | 1.5 km || 
|-id=540 bgcolor=#d6d6d6
| 490540 ||  || — || November 9, 2009 || Kitt Peak || Spacewatch || — || align=right | 2.7 km || 
|-id=541 bgcolor=#E9E9E9
| 490541 ||  || — || November 9, 2009 || Mount Lemmon || Mount Lemmon Survey || AGN || align=right data-sort-value="0.97" | 970 m || 
|-id=542 bgcolor=#fefefe
| 490542 ||  || — || September 22, 2009 || Mount Lemmon || Mount Lemmon Survey || — || align=right data-sort-value="0.67" | 670 m || 
|-id=543 bgcolor=#d6d6d6
| 490543 ||  || — || October 1, 2009 || Mount Lemmon || Mount Lemmon Survey || — || align=right | 3.2 km || 
|-id=544 bgcolor=#fefefe
| 490544 ||  || — || November 9, 2009 || Kitt Peak || Spacewatch || — || align=right data-sort-value="0.65" | 650 m || 
|-id=545 bgcolor=#E9E9E9
| 490545 ||  || — || December 29, 2005 || Kitt Peak || Spacewatch || — || align=right | 1.5 km || 
|-id=546 bgcolor=#fefefe
| 490546 ||  || — || October 12, 2009 || Mount Lemmon || Mount Lemmon Survey || — || align=right data-sort-value="0.86" | 860 m || 
|-id=547 bgcolor=#fefefe
| 490547 ||  || — || November 11, 2009 || Mount Lemmon || Mount Lemmon Survey || — || align=right data-sort-value="0.55" | 550 m || 
|-id=548 bgcolor=#fefefe
| 490548 ||  || — || November 8, 2009 || Kitt Peak || Spacewatch || — || align=right data-sort-value="0.48" | 480 m || 
|-id=549 bgcolor=#d6d6d6
| 490549 ||  || — || November 9, 2009 || Kitt Peak || Spacewatch || VER || align=right | 2.6 km || 
|-id=550 bgcolor=#fefefe
| 490550 ||  || — || November 11, 2009 || Kitt Peak || Spacewatch || — || align=right data-sort-value="0.62" | 620 m || 
|-id=551 bgcolor=#E9E9E9
| 490551 ||  || — || September 16, 2009 || Kitt Peak || Spacewatch || DOR || align=right | 2.2 km || 
|-id=552 bgcolor=#d6d6d6
| 490552 ||  || — || November 11, 2009 || Kitt Peak || Spacewatch || — || align=right | 3.1 km || 
|-id=553 bgcolor=#d6d6d6
| 490553 ||  || — || July 29, 2008 || La Sagra || OAM Obs. || — || align=right | 2.7 km || 
|-id=554 bgcolor=#d6d6d6
| 490554 ||  || — || November 8, 2009 || Kitt Peak || Spacewatch || — || align=right | 5.3 km || 
|-id=555 bgcolor=#d6d6d6
| 490555 ||  || — || November 11, 2009 || Kitt Peak || Spacewatch || — || align=right | 3.0 km || 
|-id=556 bgcolor=#d6d6d6
| 490556 ||  || — || November 16, 2009 || Kitt Peak || Spacewatch || — || align=right | 2.7 km || 
|-id=557 bgcolor=#E9E9E9
| 490557 ||  || — || October 22, 2009 || Mount Lemmon || Mount Lemmon Survey || — || align=right | 1.1 km || 
|-id=558 bgcolor=#E9E9E9
| 490558 ||  || — || November 17, 2009 || Mount Lemmon || Mount Lemmon Survey || — || align=right | 1.8 km || 
|-id=559 bgcolor=#FA8072
| 490559 ||  || — || September 22, 2009 || Mount Lemmon || Mount Lemmon Survey || — || align=right | 1.1 km || 
|-id=560 bgcolor=#fefefe
| 490560 ||  || — || November 20, 2009 || Calvin-Rehoboth || L. A. Molnar || — || align=right data-sort-value="0.62" | 620 m || 
|-id=561 bgcolor=#C2FFFF
| 490561 ||  || — || October 24, 2009 || Kitt Peak || Spacewatch || L4 || align=right | 8.6 km || 
|-id=562 bgcolor=#d6d6d6
| 490562 ||  || — || October 27, 2009 || Kitt Peak || Spacewatch || — || align=right | 2.3 km || 
|-id=563 bgcolor=#d6d6d6
| 490563 ||  || — || November 16, 2009 || Kitt Peak || Spacewatch || — || align=right | 2.8 km || 
|-id=564 bgcolor=#fefefe
| 490564 ||  || — || January 26, 2007 || Kitt Peak || Spacewatch || — || align=right data-sort-value="0.45" | 450 m || 
|-id=565 bgcolor=#fefefe
| 490565 ||  || — || September 20, 2009 || Mount Lemmon || Mount Lemmon Survey || NYS || align=right data-sort-value="0.61" | 610 m || 
|-id=566 bgcolor=#d6d6d6
| 490566 ||  || — || November 17, 2009 || Kitt Peak || Spacewatch || — || align=right | 3.1 km || 
|-id=567 bgcolor=#d6d6d6
| 490567 ||  || — || September 18, 2009 || Mount Lemmon || Mount Lemmon Survey || — || align=right | 3.5 km || 
|-id=568 bgcolor=#fefefe
| 490568 ||  || — || November 16, 2009 || Kitt Peak || Spacewatch || — || align=right data-sort-value="0.64" | 640 m || 
|-id=569 bgcolor=#d6d6d6
| 490569 ||  || — || November 16, 2009 || Mount Lemmon || Mount Lemmon Survey || — || align=right | 2.7 km || 
|-id=570 bgcolor=#d6d6d6
| 490570 ||  || — || October 18, 2009 || Mount Lemmon || Mount Lemmon Survey || EMA || align=right | 3.5 km || 
|-id=571 bgcolor=#d6d6d6
| 490571 ||  || — || October 22, 2009 || Mount Lemmon || Mount Lemmon Survey || EOS || align=right | 1.8 km || 
|-id=572 bgcolor=#d6d6d6
| 490572 ||  || — || November 16, 2009 || Mount Lemmon || Mount Lemmon Survey || — || align=right | 2.9 km || 
|-id=573 bgcolor=#fefefe
| 490573 ||  || — || September 24, 2009 || Mount Lemmon || Mount Lemmon Survey || (2076) || align=right data-sort-value="0.73" | 730 m || 
|-id=574 bgcolor=#d6d6d6
| 490574 ||  || — || November 10, 2009 || Kitt Peak || Spacewatch || — || align=right | 3.2 km || 
|-id=575 bgcolor=#d6d6d6
| 490575 ||  || — || July 29, 2008 || Mount Lemmon || Mount Lemmon Survey || EOS || align=right | 1.6 km || 
|-id=576 bgcolor=#E9E9E9
| 490576 ||  || — || November 19, 2009 || Kitt Peak || Spacewatch || (5) || align=right | 2.0 km || 
|-id=577 bgcolor=#d6d6d6
| 490577 ||  || — || September 20, 2009 || Mount Lemmon || Mount Lemmon Survey || EOS || align=right | 1.8 km || 
|-id=578 bgcolor=#E9E9E9
| 490578 ||  || — || October 30, 2009 || Mount Lemmon || Mount Lemmon Survey || — || align=right | 1.8 km || 
|-id=579 bgcolor=#E9E9E9
| 490579 ||  || — || November 22, 2009 || Kitt Peak || Spacewatch || — || align=right | 1.9 km || 
|-id=580 bgcolor=#d6d6d6
| 490580 ||  || — || November 18, 2009 || La Sagra || OAM Obs. || — || align=right | 5.0 km || 
|-id=581 bgcolor=#FFC2E0
| 490581 ||  || — || November 25, 2009 || Catalina || CSS || ATEPHA || align=right data-sort-value="0.24" | 240 m || 
|-id=582 bgcolor=#d6d6d6
| 490582 ||  || — || November 18, 2009 || Kitt Peak || Spacewatch || — || align=right | 2.6 km || 
|-id=583 bgcolor=#d6d6d6
| 490583 ||  || — || September 19, 2009 || Kitt Peak || Spacewatch || EOS || align=right | 1.5 km || 
|-id=584 bgcolor=#fefefe
| 490584 ||  || — || November 8, 2009 || Kitt Peak || Spacewatch || — || align=right data-sort-value="0.69" | 690 m || 
|-id=585 bgcolor=#d6d6d6
| 490585 ||  || — || November 20, 2009 || Kitt Peak || Spacewatch || — || align=right | 4.1 km || 
|-id=586 bgcolor=#fefefe
| 490586 ||  || — || October 22, 2009 || Mount Lemmon || Mount Lemmon Survey || — || align=right data-sort-value="0.66" | 660 m || 
|-id=587 bgcolor=#E9E9E9
| 490587 ||  || — || December 18, 2001 || Socorro || LINEAR || — || align=right data-sort-value="0.87" | 870 m || 
|-id=588 bgcolor=#d6d6d6
| 490588 ||  || — || October 23, 2009 || Kitt Peak || Spacewatch || — || align=right | 2.6 km || 
|-id=589 bgcolor=#E9E9E9
| 490589 ||  || — || April 15, 2007 || Kitt Peak || Spacewatch || — || align=right | 2.2 km || 
|-id=590 bgcolor=#fefefe
| 490590 ||  || — || November 19, 2009 || Mount Lemmon || Mount Lemmon Survey || — || align=right data-sort-value="0.86" | 860 m || 
|-id=591 bgcolor=#d6d6d6
| 490591 ||  || — || November 19, 2009 || La Sagra || OAM Obs. || — || align=right | 2.9 km || 
|-id=592 bgcolor=#d6d6d6
| 490592 ||  || — || October 25, 2009 || Kitt Peak || Spacewatch || THB || align=right | 2.9 km || 
|-id=593 bgcolor=#fefefe
| 490593 ||  || — || November 10, 2009 || Kitt Peak || Spacewatch || V || align=right data-sort-value="0.48" | 480 m || 
|-id=594 bgcolor=#d6d6d6
| 490594 ||  || — || November 9, 2009 || Kitt Peak || Spacewatch || — || align=right | 2.3 km || 
|-id=595 bgcolor=#d6d6d6
| 490595 ||  || — || November 11, 2009 || Kitt Peak || Spacewatch || — || align=right | 2.3 km || 
|-id=596 bgcolor=#d6d6d6
| 490596 ||  || — || November 22, 2009 || Kitt Peak || Spacewatch || EOS || align=right | 2.1 km || 
|-id=597 bgcolor=#d6d6d6
| 490597 ||  || — || April 25, 2000 || Anderson Mesa || LONEOS || THB || align=right | 3.5 km || 
|-id=598 bgcolor=#fefefe
| 490598 ||  || — || November 23, 2009 || Kitt Peak || Spacewatch || — || align=right data-sort-value="0.62" | 620 m || 
|-id=599 bgcolor=#d6d6d6
| 490599 ||  || — || November 11, 2009 || Kitt Peak || Spacewatch || — || align=right | 2.6 km || 
|-id=600 bgcolor=#d6d6d6
| 490600 ||  || — || November 23, 2009 || Kitt Peak || Spacewatch || — || align=right | 3.6 km || 
|}

490601–490700 

|-bgcolor=#d6d6d6
| 490601 ||  || — || November 23, 2009 || Kitt Peak || Spacewatch || — || align=right | 2.5 km || 
|-id=602 bgcolor=#d6d6d6
| 490602 ||  || — || November 11, 2009 || Kitt Peak || Spacewatch || — || align=right | 2.9 km || 
|-id=603 bgcolor=#d6d6d6
| 490603 ||  || — || October 17, 2009 || Mount Lemmon || Mount Lemmon Survey || — || align=right | 2.8 km || 
|-id=604 bgcolor=#d6d6d6
| 490604 ||  || — || November 13, 2009 || La Sagra || OAM Obs. || — || align=right | 4.2 km || 
|-id=605 bgcolor=#d6d6d6
| 490605 ||  || — || November 23, 2009 || Kitt Peak || Spacewatch || — || align=right | 2.7 km || 
|-id=606 bgcolor=#fefefe
| 490606 ||  || — || October 22, 2009 || Mount Lemmon || Mount Lemmon Survey || — || align=right data-sort-value="0.87" | 870 m || 
|-id=607 bgcolor=#d6d6d6
| 490607 ||  || — || October 24, 2009 || Kitt Peak || Spacewatch || BRA || align=right | 1.4 km || 
|-id=608 bgcolor=#C2FFFF
| 490608 ||  || — || June 2, 2008 || Mount Lemmon || Mount Lemmon Survey || L4 || align=right | 8.3 km || 
|-id=609 bgcolor=#E9E9E9
| 490609 ||  || — || November 20, 2009 || Mount Lemmon || Mount Lemmon Survey || — || align=right | 1.8 km || 
|-id=610 bgcolor=#d6d6d6
| 490610 ||  || — || October 17, 2009 || Mount Lemmon || Mount Lemmon Survey || — || align=right | 3.3 km || 
|-id=611 bgcolor=#d6d6d6
| 490611 ||  || — || November 16, 2009 || Kitt Peak || Spacewatch || — || align=right | 2.5 km || 
|-id=612 bgcolor=#d6d6d6
| 490612 ||  || — || October 22, 2009 || Mount Lemmon || Mount Lemmon Survey || — || align=right | 2.3 km || 
|-id=613 bgcolor=#fefefe
| 490613 ||  || — || November 17, 2009 || Kitt Peak || Spacewatch || NYS || align=right data-sort-value="0.48" | 480 m || 
|-id=614 bgcolor=#d6d6d6
| 490614 ||  || — || November 10, 2009 || Kitt Peak || Spacewatch || — || align=right | 2.6 km || 
|-id=615 bgcolor=#d6d6d6
| 490615 ||  || — || December 15, 2009 || Mount Lemmon || Mount Lemmon Survey || — || align=right | 3.8 km || 
|-id=616 bgcolor=#d6d6d6
| 490616 ||  || — || December 11, 2009 || Mount Lemmon || Mount Lemmon Survey || — || align=right | 2.9 km || 
|-id=617 bgcolor=#d6d6d6
| 490617 ||  || — || December 17, 2009 || Kitt Peak || Spacewatch || HYG || align=right | 2.7 km || 
|-id=618 bgcolor=#d6d6d6
| 490618 ||  || — || December 17, 2009 || Mount Lemmon || Mount Lemmon Survey || EOS || align=right | 1.8 km || 
|-id=619 bgcolor=#E9E9E9
| 490619 ||  || — || December 17, 2009 || Kitt Peak || Spacewatch || — || align=right data-sort-value="0.84" | 840 m || 
|-id=620 bgcolor=#E9E9E9
| 490620 ||  || — || December 18, 2009 || Mount Lemmon || Mount Lemmon Survey || (5) || align=right data-sort-value="0.63" | 630 m || 
|-id=621 bgcolor=#fefefe
| 490621 ||  || — || September 11, 2005 || Kitt Peak || Spacewatch || — || align=right data-sort-value="0.68" | 680 m || 
|-id=622 bgcolor=#d6d6d6
| 490622 ||  || — || November 10, 2009 || Mount Lemmon || Mount Lemmon Survey || — || align=right | 2.9 km || 
|-id=623 bgcolor=#fefefe
| 490623 ||  || — || January 7, 2010 || Kitt Peak || Spacewatch || — || align=right data-sort-value="0.65" | 650 m || 
|-id=624 bgcolor=#fefefe
| 490624 ||  || — || October 9, 2005 || Kitt Peak || Spacewatch || — || align=right data-sort-value="0.60" | 600 m || 
|-id=625 bgcolor=#E9E9E9
| 490625 ||  || — || January 12, 2010 || Kitt Peak || Spacewatch || — || align=right | 1.2 km || 
|-id=626 bgcolor=#E9E9E9
| 490626 ||  || — || January 8, 2010 || WISE || WISE || DOR || align=right | 2.2 km || 
|-id=627 bgcolor=#E9E9E9
| 490627 ||  || — || January 21, 2010 || Nazaret || G. Muler || — || align=right | 1.3 km || 
|-id=628 bgcolor=#E9E9E9
| 490628 Chassigny ||  ||  || January 24, 2010 || Nogales || J.-C. Merlin || (5) || align=right data-sort-value="0.64" | 640 m || 
|-id=629 bgcolor=#d6d6d6
| 490629 ||  || — || October 1, 2009 || Mount Lemmon || Mount Lemmon Survey || — || align=right | 3.9 km || 
|-id=630 bgcolor=#d6d6d6
| 490630 ||  || — || January 30, 2010 || WISE || WISE || — || align=right | 4.0 km || 
|-id=631 bgcolor=#fefefe
| 490631 ||  || — || February 8, 2010 || Kitt Peak || Spacewatch || — || align=right data-sort-value="0.62" | 620 m || 
|-id=632 bgcolor=#fefefe
| 490632 ||  || — || February 9, 2010 || Kitt Peak || Spacewatch || — || align=right data-sort-value="0.59" | 590 m || 
|-id=633 bgcolor=#d6d6d6
| 490633 ||  || — || January 6, 2010 || Kitt Peak || Spacewatch || — || align=right | 4.0 km || 
|-id=634 bgcolor=#fefefe
| 490634 ||  || — || February 7, 2010 || La Sagra || OAM Obs. || — || align=right | 2.0 km || 
|-id=635 bgcolor=#fefefe
| 490635 ||  || — || December 20, 2009 || Mount Lemmon || Mount Lemmon Survey || — || align=right data-sort-value="0.68" | 680 m || 
|-id=636 bgcolor=#FFC2E0
| 490636 ||  || — || February 16, 2010 || Mount Lemmon || Mount Lemmon Survey || AMO || align=right data-sort-value="0.68" | 680 m || 
|-id=637 bgcolor=#d6d6d6
| 490637 ||  || — || December 11, 2009 || Mount Lemmon || Mount Lemmon Survey || — || align=right | 5.1 km || 
|-id=638 bgcolor=#fefefe
| 490638 ||  || — || February 17, 2010 || Kitt Peak || Spacewatch || (2076) || align=right data-sort-value="0.90" | 900 m || 
|-id=639 bgcolor=#d6d6d6
| 490639 ||  || — || December 11, 2009 || Mount Lemmon || Mount Lemmon Survey || — || align=right | 3.8 km || 
|-id=640 bgcolor=#fefefe
| 490640 ||  || — || March 4, 2010 || Kitt Peak || Spacewatch || — || align=right data-sort-value="0.68" | 680 m || 
|-id=641 bgcolor=#fefefe
| 490641 ||  || — || March 12, 2010 || Mount Lemmon || Mount Lemmon Survey || — || align=right data-sort-value="0.63" | 630 m || 
|-id=642 bgcolor=#fefefe
| 490642 ||  || — || February 17, 2010 || Kitt Peak || Spacewatch || — || align=right data-sort-value="0.54" | 540 m || 
|-id=643 bgcolor=#fefefe
| 490643 ||  || — || March 12, 2010 || Mount Lemmon || Mount Lemmon Survey || — || align=right data-sort-value="0.59" | 590 m || 
|-id=644 bgcolor=#fefefe
| 490644 ||  || — || October 8, 2008 || Kitt Peak || Spacewatch || — || align=right data-sort-value="0.68" | 680 m || 
|-id=645 bgcolor=#d6d6d6
| 490645 ||  || — || March 9, 2010 || La Sagra || OAM Obs. || — || align=right | 4.3 km || 
|-id=646 bgcolor=#fefefe
| 490646 ||  || — || March 12, 2010 || Kitt Peak || Spacewatch || — || align=right data-sort-value="0.78" | 780 m || 
|-id=647 bgcolor=#fefefe
| 490647 ||  || — || March 12, 2010 || Kitt Peak || Spacewatch || — || align=right data-sort-value="0.53" | 530 m || 
|-id=648 bgcolor=#fefefe
| 490648 ||  || — || March 13, 2010 || Kitt Peak || Spacewatch || — || align=right data-sort-value="0.71" | 710 m || 
|-id=649 bgcolor=#fefefe
| 490649 ||  || — || March 13, 2010 || Mount Lemmon || Mount Lemmon Survey || — || align=right data-sort-value="0.64" | 640 m || 
|-id=650 bgcolor=#fefefe
| 490650 ||  || — || March 16, 2010 || WISE || WISE || — || align=right | 2.6 km || 
|-id=651 bgcolor=#fefefe
| 490651 ||  || — || April 25, 2003 || Kitt Peak || Spacewatch || — || align=right data-sort-value="0.73" | 730 m || 
|-id=652 bgcolor=#fefefe
| 490652 ||  || — || March 16, 2010 || Mount Lemmon || Mount Lemmon Survey || — || align=right data-sort-value="0.58" | 580 m || 
|-id=653 bgcolor=#fefefe
| 490653 ||  || — || March 21, 2010 || Kitt Peak || Spacewatch || — || align=right data-sort-value="0.65" | 650 m || 
|-id=654 bgcolor=#fefefe
| 490654 ||  || — || March 18, 2010 || Kitt Peak || Spacewatch || — || align=right data-sort-value="0.75" | 750 m || 
|-id=655 bgcolor=#fefefe
| 490655 ||  || — || April 5, 2010 || Kitt Peak || Spacewatch || — || align=right data-sort-value="0.82" | 820 m || 
|-id=656 bgcolor=#E9E9E9
| 490656 ||  || — || April 4, 2010 || Catalina || CSS || DOR || align=right | 2.4 km || 
|-id=657 bgcolor=#fefefe
| 490657 ||  || — || April 9, 2010 || Mount Lemmon || Mount Lemmon Survey || — || align=right data-sort-value="0.78" | 780 m || 
|-id=658 bgcolor=#fefefe
| 490658 ||  || — || April 8, 2010 || Kitt Peak || Spacewatch || V || align=right data-sort-value="0.61" | 610 m || 
|-id=659 bgcolor=#fefefe
| 490659 ||  || — || April 9, 2010 || Mount Lemmon || Mount Lemmon Survey || — || align=right data-sort-value="0.60" | 600 m || 
|-id=660 bgcolor=#fefefe
| 490660 ||  || — || January 27, 2010 || WISE || WISE || — || align=right | 1.1 km || 
|-id=661 bgcolor=#fefefe
| 490661 ||  || — || April 10, 2010 || Kitt Peak || Spacewatch || — || align=right | 1.8 km || 
|-id=662 bgcolor=#fefefe
| 490662 ||  || — || April 22, 2010 || WISE || WISE || — || align=right | 1.2 km || 
|-id=663 bgcolor=#fefefe
| 490663 ||  || — || April 26, 2010 || WISE || WISE || — || align=right | 1.6 km || 
|-id=664 bgcolor=#fefefe
| 490664 ||  || — || April 10, 2010 || Kitt Peak || Spacewatch || — || align=right data-sort-value="0.63" | 630 m || 
|-id=665 bgcolor=#fefefe
| 490665 ||  || — || May 1, 2003 || Kitt Peak || Spacewatch || — || align=right data-sort-value="0.55" | 550 m || 
|-id=666 bgcolor=#fefefe
| 490666 ||  || — || January 26, 2006 || Kitt Peak || Spacewatch || — || align=right data-sort-value="0.57" | 570 m || 
|-id=667 bgcolor=#fefefe
| 490667 ||  || — || April 20, 2010 || Kitt Peak || Spacewatch || — || align=right data-sort-value="0.65" | 650 m || 
|-id=668 bgcolor=#fefefe
| 490668 ||  || — || May 3, 2010 || Kitt Peak || Spacewatch || NYS || align=right data-sort-value="0.49" | 490 m || 
|-id=669 bgcolor=#fefefe
| 490669 ||  || — || May 5, 2010 || Catalina || CSS || — || align=right | 1.6 km || 
|-id=670 bgcolor=#fefefe
| 490670 ||  || — || April 8, 2010 || Kitt Peak || Spacewatch || — || align=right data-sort-value="0.78" | 780 m || 
|-id=671 bgcolor=#d6d6d6
| 490671 ||  || — || March 12, 2010 || Kitt Peak || Spacewatch || 3:2 || align=right | 4.5 km || 
|-id=672 bgcolor=#fefefe
| 490672 ||  || — || April 9, 2010 || Kitt Peak || Spacewatch || — || align=right data-sort-value="0.50" | 500 m || 
|-id=673 bgcolor=#E9E9E9
| 490673 ||  || — || May 11, 2010 || WISE || WISE || — || align=right | 1.8 km || 
|-id=674 bgcolor=#fefefe
| 490674 ||  || — || January 25, 2010 || WISE || WISE || — || align=right | 1.4 km || 
|-id=675 bgcolor=#fefefe
| 490675 ||  || — || January 28, 2010 || WISE || WISE || — || align=right | 1.8 km || 
|-id=676 bgcolor=#fefefe
| 490676 ||  || — || February 3, 2006 || Mount Lemmon || Mount Lemmon Survey || — || align=right data-sort-value="0.66" | 660 m || 
|-id=677 bgcolor=#fefefe
| 490677 ||  || — || April 15, 2010 || Catalina || CSS || — || align=right | 1.4 km || 
|-id=678 bgcolor=#fefefe
| 490678 ||  || — || May 9, 2010 || Siding Spring || SSS || — || align=right | 1.4 km || 
|-id=679 bgcolor=#d6d6d6
| 490679 ||  || — || May 23, 2010 || WISE || WISE || LIX || align=right | 4.1 km || 
|-id=680 bgcolor=#fefefe
| 490680 ||  || — || May 26, 2010 || WISE || WISE || — || align=right | 1.5 km || 
|-id=681 bgcolor=#d6d6d6
| 490681 ||  || — || June 2, 2010 || WISE || WISE || — || align=right | 2.9 km || 
|-id=682 bgcolor=#d6d6d6
| 490682 ||  || — || June 6, 2010 || WISE || WISE || — || align=right | 3.7 km || 
|-id=683 bgcolor=#fefefe
| 490683 ||  || — || May 7, 2010 || Catalina || CSS || — || align=right data-sort-value="0.61" | 610 m || 
|-id=684 bgcolor=#FFC2E0
| 490684 ||  || — || June 9, 2010 || Catalina || CSS || APO || align=right data-sort-value="0.46" | 460 m || 
|-id=685 bgcolor=#d6d6d6
| 490685 ||  || — || June 6, 2010 || WISE || WISE || (8737) || align=right | 3.2 km || 
|-id=686 bgcolor=#E9E9E9
| 490686 ||  || — || June 7, 2010 || WISE || WISE || — || align=right | 1.9 km || 
|-id=687 bgcolor=#fefefe
| 490687 ||  || — || May 11, 2010 || Mount Lemmon || Mount Lemmon Survey || — || align=right | 1.0 km || 
|-id=688 bgcolor=#d6d6d6
| 490688 ||  || — || June 17, 2010 || WISE || WISE || — || align=right | 2.3 km || 
|-id=689 bgcolor=#d6d6d6
| 490689 ||  || — || June 21, 2010 || WISE || WISE || — || align=right | 2.1 km || 
|-id=690 bgcolor=#E9E9E9
| 490690 ||  || — || June 25, 2010 || WISE || WISE || ADE || align=right | 2.0 km || 
|-id=691 bgcolor=#d6d6d6
| 490691 ||  || — || June 21, 2010 || Kitt Peak || Spacewatch || — || align=right | 3.6 km || 
|-id=692 bgcolor=#fefefe
| 490692 ||  || — || July 6, 2010 || Mount Lemmon || Mount Lemmon Survey || — || align=right data-sort-value="0.90" | 900 m || 
|-id=693 bgcolor=#E9E9E9
| 490693 ||  || — || July 5, 2010 || Kitt Peak || Spacewatch || — || align=right | 2.3 km || 
|-id=694 bgcolor=#d6d6d6
| 490694 ||  || — || July 7, 2010 || WISE || WISE || — || align=right | 3.0 km || 
|-id=695 bgcolor=#d6d6d6
| 490695 ||  || — || July 19, 2010 || WISE || WISE || — || align=right | 1.9 km || 
|-id=696 bgcolor=#E9E9E9
| 490696 ||  || — || July 25, 2010 || WISE || WISE || — || align=right | 2.4 km || 
|-id=697 bgcolor=#d6d6d6
| 490697 ||  || — || July 25, 2010 || WISE || WISE || LIX || align=right | 2.6 km || 
|-id=698 bgcolor=#d6d6d6
| 490698 ||  || — || November 25, 2005 || Kitt Peak || Spacewatch || — || align=right | 2.3 km || 
|-id=699 bgcolor=#fefefe
| 490699 ||  || — || January 28, 2010 || WISE || WISE || — || align=right | 2.0 km || 
|-id=700 bgcolor=#E9E9E9
| 490700 ||  || — || July 31, 2010 || WISE || WISE || — || align=right | 1.8 km || 
|}

490701–490800 

|-bgcolor=#fefefe
| 490701 ||  || — || August 5, 2010 || La Sagra || OAM Obs. || MAS || align=right data-sort-value="0.71" | 710 m || 
|-id=702 bgcolor=#d6d6d6
| 490702 ||  || — || August 5, 2010 || WISE || WISE || — || align=right | 2.9 km || 
|-id=703 bgcolor=#d6d6d6
| 490703 ||  || — || August 6, 2010 || WISE || WISE || — || align=right | 1.3 km || 
|-id=704 bgcolor=#E9E9E9
| 490704 ||  || — || August 7, 2010 || La Sagra || OAM Obs. || — || align=right | 2.1 km || 
|-id=705 bgcolor=#fefefe
| 490705 ||  || — || August 5, 2010 || La Sagra || OAM Obs. || V || align=right data-sort-value="0.78" | 780 m || 
|-id=706 bgcolor=#E9E9E9
| 490706 ||  || — || August 10, 2010 || Kitt Peak || Spacewatch || — || align=right data-sort-value="0.98" | 980 m || 
|-id=707 bgcolor=#E9E9E9
| 490707 ||  || — || August 21, 2010 || WISE || WISE || — || align=right | 3.3 km || 
|-id=708 bgcolor=#d6d6d6
| 490708 ||  || — || August 20, 2010 || La Sagra || OAM Obs. || — || align=right | 2.7 km || 
|-id=709 bgcolor=#fefefe
| 490709 ||  || — || September 2, 2010 || Mount Lemmon || Mount Lemmon Survey || — || align=right data-sort-value="0.75" | 750 m || 
|-id=710 bgcolor=#fefefe
| 490710 ||  || — || September 2, 2010 || Mount Lemmon || Mount Lemmon Survey || H || align=right data-sort-value="0.66" | 660 m || 
|-id=711 bgcolor=#E9E9E9
| 490711 ||  || — || April 30, 2009 || Kitt Peak || Spacewatch || JUN || align=right | 1.0 km || 
|-id=712 bgcolor=#E9E9E9
| 490712 ||  || — || September 3, 2010 || Mount Lemmon || Mount Lemmon Survey || — || align=right data-sort-value="0.98" | 980 m || 
|-id=713 bgcolor=#d6d6d6
| 490713 ||  || — || September 30, 2005 || Mount Lemmon || Mount Lemmon Survey || critical || align=right | 1.3 km || 
|-id=714 bgcolor=#E9E9E9
| 490714 ||  || — || September 5, 2010 || La Sagra || OAM Obs. || — || align=right | 1.8 km || 
|-id=715 bgcolor=#fefefe
| 490715 ||  || — || September 16, 2003 || Kitt Peak || Spacewatch || — || align=right data-sort-value="0.86" | 860 m || 
|-id=716 bgcolor=#d6d6d6
| 490716 ||  || — || September 6, 2010 || La Sagra || OAM Obs. || — || align=right | 3.1 km || 
|-id=717 bgcolor=#E9E9E9
| 490717 ||  || — || September 28, 2006 || Catalina || CSS || — || align=right | 1.8 km || 
|-id=718 bgcolor=#FA8072
| 490718 ||  || — || September 11, 2010 || Siding Spring || SSS || — || align=right data-sort-value="0.38" | 380 m || 
|-id=719 bgcolor=#d6d6d6
| 490719 ||  || — || September 2, 2010 || Mount Lemmon || Mount Lemmon Survey || — || align=right | 1.7 km || 
|-id=720 bgcolor=#E9E9E9
| 490720 ||  || — || September 10, 2010 || Kitt Peak || Spacewatch || GEF || align=right | 1.0 km || 
|-id=721 bgcolor=#fefefe
| 490721 ||  || — || September 2, 2010 || Socorro || LINEAR || H || align=right data-sort-value="0.69" | 690 m || 
|-id=722 bgcolor=#d6d6d6
| 490722 ||  || — || September 2, 2010 || Mount Lemmon || Mount Lemmon Survey || EOS || align=right | 1.6 km || 
|-id=723 bgcolor=#E9E9E9
| 490723 ||  || — || October 19, 2006 || Kitt Peak || Spacewatch || — || align=right | 1.4 km || 
|-id=724 bgcolor=#E9E9E9
| 490724 ||  || — || September 9, 2010 || Kitt Peak || Spacewatch || EUN || align=right data-sort-value="0.98" | 980 m || 
|-id=725 bgcolor=#fefefe
| 490725 ||  || — || January 13, 2008 || Kitt Peak || Spacewatch || — || align=right data-sort-value="0.60" | 600 m || 
|-id=726 bgcolor=#E9E9E9
| 490726 ||  || — || September 12, 2010 || Kitt Peak || Spacewatch || — || align=right | 1.4 km || 
|-id=727 bgcolor=#fefefe
| 490727 ||  || — || September 29, 2000 || Kitt Peak || Spacewatch || — || align=right data-sort-value="0.53" | 530 m || 
|-id=728 bgcolor=#d6d6d6
| 490728 ||  || — || September 14, 2010 || Kitt Peak || Spacewatch || — || align=right | 2.0 km || 
|-id=729 bgcolor=#d6d6d6
| 490729 ||  || — || September 15, 2010 || Kitt Peak || Spacewatch || VER || align=right | 2.3 km || 
|-id=730 bgcolor=#E9E9E9
| 490730 ||  || — || September 15, 2010 || Kitt Peak || Spacewatch || — || align=right | 1.3 km || 
|-id=731 bgcolor=#fefefe
| 490731 ||  || — || September 1, 2010 || Mount Lemmon || Mount Lemmon Survey || MAS || align=right data-sort-value="0.72" | 720 m || 
|-id=732 bgcolor=#d6d6d6
| 490732 ||  || — || September 4, 2010 || Kitt Peak || Spacewatch || — || align=right | 1.8 km || 
|-id=733 bgcolor=#d6d6d6
| 490733 ||  || — || March 28, 2008 || Mount Lemmon || Mount Lemmon Survey || — || align=right | 2.7 km || 
|-id=734 bgcolor=#d6d6d6
| 490734 ||  || — || September 8, 2010 || Kitt Peak || Spacewatch || — || align=right | 2.7 km || 
|-id=735 bgcolor=#E9E9E9
| 490735 ||  || — || March 1, 2008 || Kitt Peak || Spacewatch || — || align=right | 1.5 km || 
|-id=736 bgcolor=#E9E9E9
| 490736 ||  || — || September 9, 2010 || Kitt Peak || Spacewatch || — || align=right | 2.1 km || 
|-id=737 bgcolor=#E9E9E9
| 490737 ||  || — || September 11, 2010 || Kitt Peak || Spacewatch || MAR || align=right data-sort-value="0.95" | 950 m || 
|-id=738 bgcolor=#d6d6d6
| 490738 ||  || — || June 27, 2010 || WISE || WISE || — || align=right | 2.5 km || 
|-id=739 bgcolor=#E9E9E9
| 490739 ||  || — || September 16, 2010 || Mount Lemmon || Mount Lemmon Survey || — || align=right | 1.7 km || 
|-id=740 bgcolor=#d6d6d6
| 490740 ||  || — || November 25, 2005 || Mount Lemmon || Mount Lemmon Survey || — || align=right | 1.4 km || 
|-id=741 bgcolor=#E9E9E9
| 490741 ||  || — || September 12, 2010 || Kitt Peak || Spacewatch || — || align=right | 1.6 km || 
|-id=742 bgcolor=#E9E9E9
| 490742 ||  || — || April 3, 2008 || Mount Lemmon || Mount Lemmon Survey || GEF || align=right | 1.1 km || 
|-id=743 bgcolor=#E9E9E9
| 490743 ||  || — || September 29, 2010 || Kitt Peak || Spacewatch || — || align=right | 1.1 km || 
|-id=744 bgcolor=#E9E9E9
| 490744 ||  || — || September 4, 2010 || La Sagra || OAM Obs. || RAF || align=right | 1.1 km || 
|-id=745 bgcolor=#E9E9E9
| 490745 ||  || — || September 19, 2010 || Kitt Peak || Spacewatch || (5) || align=right data-sort-value="0.81" | 810 m || 
|-id=746 bgcolor=#fefefe
| 490746 ||  || — || February 12, 2008 || Kitt Peak || Spacewatch || — || align=right data-sort-value="0.62" | 620 m || 
|-id=747 bgcolor=#E9E9E9
| 490747 ||  || — || December 30, 2007 || Kitt Peak || Spacewatch || — || align=right | 1.5 km || 
|-id=748 bgcolor=#E9E9E9
| 490748 ||  || — || April 4, 2008 || Kitt Peak || Spacewatch || — || align=right | 1.2 km || 
|-id=749 bgcolor=#fefefe
| 490749 ||  || — || October 17, 1995 || Kitt Peak || Spacewatch || — || align=right data-sort-value="0.62" | 620 m || 
|-id=750 bgcolor=#fefefe
| 490750 ||  || — || September 18, 2003 || Kitt Peak || Spacewatch || — || align=right data-sort-value="0.60" | 600 m || 
|-id=751 bgcolor=#E9E9E9
| 490751 ||  || — || April 6, 2008 || Mount Lemmon || Mount Lemmon Survey || — || align=right | 1.6 km || 
|-id=752 bgcolor=#E9E9E9
| 490752 ||  || — || October 3, 2006 || Mount Lemmon || Mount Lemmon Survey || (5) || align=right data-sort-value="0.85" | 850 m || 
|-id=753 bgcolor=#E9E9E9
| 490753 ||  || — || September 16, 2010 || Kitt Peak || Spacewatch || — || align=right | 1.9 km || 
|-id=754 bgcolor=#d6d6d6
| 490754 ||  || — || December 7, 1999 || Socorro || LINEAR || — || align=right | 2.6 km || 
|-id=755 bgcolor=#E9E9E9
| 490755 ||  || — || September 8, 2010 || La Sagra || OAM Obs. || — || align=right | 2.4 km || 
|-id=756 bgcolor=#d6d6d6
| 490756 ||  || — || September 2, 2010 || Mount Lemmon || Mount Lemmon Survey || — || align=right | 2.2 km || 
|-id=757 bgcolor=#FA8072
| 490757 ||  || — || October 7, 2010 || Catalina || CSS || H || align=right data-sort-value="0.75" | 750 m || 
|-id=758 bgcolor=#fefefe
| 490758 ||  || — || March 9, 2008 || Mount Lemmon || Mount Lemmon Survey || — || align=right data-sort-value="0.91" | 910 m || 
|-id=759 bgcolor=#fefefe
| 490759 ||  || — || December 27, 2002 || Socorro || LINEAR || H || align=right data-sort-value="0.85" | 850 m || 
|-id=760 bgcolor=#d6d6d6
| 490760 ||  || — || September 18, 2010 || Mount Lemmon || Mount Lemmon Survey || — || align=right | 2.1 km || 
|-id=761 bgcolor=#fefefe
| 490761 ||  || — || October 8, 2010 || Kitt Peak || Spacewatch || — || align=right data-sort-value="0.65" | 650 m || 
|-id=762 bgcolor=#E9E9E9
| 490762 ||  || — || September 10, 2010 || Kitt Peak || Spacewatch || — || align=right | 2.7 km || 
|-id=763 bgcolor=#C2FFFF
| 490763 ||  || — || October 8, 2010 || Haleakala || Pan-STARRS || L4 || align=right | 5.9 km || 
|-id=764 bgcolor=#C2FFFF
| 490764 ||  || — || October 16, 2009 || Mount Lemmon || Mount Lemmon Survey || L4 || align=right | 8.2 km || 
|-id=765 bgcolor=#C2FFFF
| 490765 ||  || — || September 19, 2009 || Kitt Peak || Spacewatch || L4 || align=right | 6.2 km || 
|-id=766 bgcolor=#E9E9E9
| 490766 ||  || — || October 17, 2010 || Mount Lemmon || Mount Lemmon Survey || BRG || align=right | 1.7 km || 
|-id=767 bgcolor=#E9E9E9
| 490767 ||  || — || November 19, 2006 || Kitt Peak || Spacewatch || — || align=right | 1.4 km || 
|-id=768 bgcolor=#E9E9E9
| 490768 ||  || — || September 17, 2010 || Mount Lemmon || Mount Lemmon Survey || — || align=right | 1.6 km || 
|-id=769 bgcolor=#fefefe
| 490769 ||  || — || March 31, 2009 || Kitt Peak || Spacewatch || — || align=right data-sort-value="0.72" | 720 m || 
|-id=770 bgcolor=#E9E9E9
| 490770 ||  || — || September 17, 2010 || Mount Lemmon || Mount Lemmon Survey || — || align=right | 1.4 km || 
|-id=771 bgcolor=#E9E9E9
| 490771 ||  || — || October 28, 2010 || Mount Lemmon || Mount Lemmon Survey || — || align=right | 2.1 km || 
|-id=772 bgcolor=#E9E9E9
| 490772 ||  || — || October 29, 2010 || Kitt Peak || Spacewatch || AGN || align=right data-sort-value="0.93" | 930 m || 
|-id=773 bgcolor=#E9E9E9
| 490773 ||  || — || October 12, 2010 || Kitt Peak || Spacewatch || — || align=right | 2.4 km || 
|-id=774 bgcolor=#E9E9E9
| 490774 ||  || — || November 12, 2006 || Mount Lemmon || Mount Lemmon Survey || — || align=right data-sort-value="0.94" | 940 m || 
|-id=775 bgcolor=#C2FFFF
| 490775 ||  || — || October 13, 2010 || Mount Lemmon || Mount Lemmon Survey || L4 || align=right | 7.0 km || 
|-id=776 bgcolor=#E9E9E9
| 490776 ||  || — || October 12, 2010 || Mount Lemmon || Mount Lemmon Survey || — || align=right | 1.1 km || 
|-id=777 bgcolor=#d6d6d6
| 490777 ||  || — || October 25, 2005 || Kitt Peak || Spacewatch || — || align=right | 2.2 km || 
|-id=778 bgcolor=#C2FFFF
| 490778 ||  || — || September 15, 2009 || Kitt Peak || Spacewatch || L4 || align=right | 8.2 km || 
|-id=779 bgcolor=#d6d6d6
| 490779 ||  || — || October 29, 2010 || Kitt Peak || Spacewatch || — || align=right | 2.3 km || 
|-id=780 bgcolor=#fefefe
| 490780 ||  || — || August 19, 2006 || Kitt Peak || Spacewatch || NYS || align=right data-sort-value="0.51" | 510 m || 
|-id=781 bgcolor=#E9E9E9
| 490781 ||  || — || September 10, 2010 || Mount Lemmon || Mount Lemmon Survey || — || align=right data-sort-value="0.90" | 900 m || 
|-id=782 bgcolor=#E9E9E9
| 490782 ||  || — || October 12, 2010 || Mount Lemmon || Mount Lemmon Survey || — || align=right | 1.8 km || 
|-id=783 bgcolor=#E9E9E9
| 490783 ||  || — || October 28, 2010 || Mount Lemmon || Mount Lemmon Survey || — || align=right | 2.3 km || 
|-id=784 bgcolor=#d6d6d6
| 490784 ||  || — || October 13, 2010 || Mount Lemmon || Mount Lemmon Survey || — || align=right | 2.0 km || 
|-id=785 bgcolor=#C2FFFF
| 490785 ||  || — || October 31, 2010 || Mount Lemmon || Mount Lemmon Survey || L4 || align=right | 6.9 km || 
|-id=786 bgcolor=#E9E9E9
| 490786 ||  || — || October 19, 2010 || Mount Lemmon || Mount Lemmon Survey || PAD || align=right | 1.3 km || 
|-id=787 bgcolor=#E9E9E9
| 490787 ||  || — || October 19, 2006 || Kitt Peak || Spacewatch || — || align=right | 1.2 km || 
|-id=788 bgcolor=#E9E9E9
| 490788 ||  || — || November 9, 1996 || Kitt Peak || Spacewatch || — || align=right | 2.5 km || 
|-id=789 bgcolor=#fefefe
| 490789 ||  || — || June 10, 2007 || Kitt Peak || Spacewatch || H || align=right data-sort-value="0.51" | 510 m || 
|-id=790 bgcolor=#fefefe
| 490790 ||  || — || September 11, 2010 || Mount Lemmon || Mount Lemmon Survey || V || align=right data-sort-value="0.53" | 530 m || 
|-id=791 bgcolor=#FFC2E0
| 490791 ||  || — || November 2, 2010 || Haleakala || Pan-STARRS || AMO || align=right data-sort-value="0.39" | 390 m || 
|-id=792 bgcolor=#E9E9E9
| 490792 ||  || — || October 12, 2010 || Mount Lemmon || Mount Lemmon Survey || — || align=right data-sort-value="0.98" | 980 m || 
|-id=793 bgcolor=#fefefe
| 490793 ||  || — || November 19, 2003 || Kitt Peak || Spacewatch || — || align=right data-sort-value="0.71" | 710 m || 
|-id=794 bgcolor=#E9E9E9
| 490794 ||  || — || October 14, 2010 || Mount Lemmon || Mount Lemmon Survey || — || align=right data-sort-value="0.98" | 980 m || 
|-id=795 bgcolor=#fefefe
| 490795 ||  || — || November 2, 2010 || Socorro || LINEAR || H || align=right data-sort-value="0.87" | 870 m || 
|-id=796 bgcolor=#E9E9E9
| 490796 ||  || — || November 2, 2010 || La Sagra || OAM Obs. || — || align=right | 1.5 km || 
|-id=797 bgcolor=#E9E9E9
| 490797 ||  || — || November 28, 1997 || Kitt Peak || Spacewatch || — || align=right | 2.2 km || 
|-id=798 bgcolor=#E9E9E9
| 490798 ||  || — || October 11, 2010 || Mount Lemmon || Mount Lemmon Survey || — || align=right | 1.7 km || 
|-id=799 bgcolor=#E9E9E9
| 490799 ||  || — || April 3, 2008 || Kitt Peak || Spacewatch || — || align=right | 1.7 km || 
|-id=800 bgcolor=#E9E9E9
| 490800 ||  || — || November 6, 2010 || Mount Lemmon || Mount Lemmon Survey || — || align=right | 2.5 km || 
|}

490801–490900 

|-bgcolor=#E9E9E9
| 490801 ||  || — || October 12, 2010 || Mount Lemmon || Mount Lemmon Survey || — || align=right | 1.7 km || 
|-id=802 bgcolor=#fefefe
| 490802 ||  || — || April 24, 2009 || Mount Lemmon || Mount Lemmon Survey || H || align=right data-sort-value="0.80" | 800 m || 
|-id=803 bgcolor=#d6d6d6
| 490803 ||  || — || October 28, 2005 || Kitt Peak || Spacewatch || — || align=right | 1.9 km || 
|-id=804 bgcolor=#C2FFFF
| 490804 ||  || — || September 28, 2009 || Kitt Peak || Spacewatch || L4 || align=right | 6.1 km || 
|-id=805 bgcolor=#d6d6d6
| 490805 ||  || — || November 6, 2010 || Kitt Peak || Spacewatch || — || align=right | 2.6 km || 
|-id=806 bgcolor=#fefefe
| 490806 ||  || — || August 27, 2006 || Kitt Peak || Spacewatch || — || align=right data-sort-value="0.60" | 600 m || 
|-id=807 bgcolor=#E9E9E9
| 490807 ||  || — || November 5, 2010 || Mount Lemmon || Mount Lemmon Survey || — || align=right | 2.0 km || 
|-id=808 bgcolor=#d6d6d6
| 490808 ||  || — || November 7, 2010 || Kitt Peak || Spacewatch || — || align=right | 2.7 km || 
|-id=809 bgcolor=#C2FFFF
| 490809 ||  || — || November 7, 2010 || Mount Lemmon || Mount Lemmon Survey || L4 || align=right | 6.8 km || 
|-id=810 bgcolor=#E9E9E9
| 490810 ||  || — || September 5, 2010 || Mount Lemmon || Mount Lemmon Survey || — || align=right | 1.1 km || 
|-id=811 bgcolor=#E9E9E9
| 490811 ||  || — || October 29, 2010 || Mount Lemmon || Mount Lemmon Survey || HOF || align=right | 2.4 km || 
|-id=812 bgcolor=#fefefe
| 490812 ||  || — || November 8, 2010 || Kitt Peak || Spacewatch || — || align=right data-sort-value="0.69" | 690 m || 
|-id=813 bgcolor=#E9E9E9
| 490813 ||  || — || October 31, 2010 || Kitt Peak || Spacewatch || — || align=right | 1.2 km || 
|-id=814 bgcolor=#E9E9E9
| 490814 ||  || — || September 30, 2010 || Mount Lemmon || Mount Lemmon Survey || AGN || align=right | 1.1 km || 
|-id=815 bgcolor=#E9E9E9
| 490815 ||  || — || November 1, 2010 || Kitt Peak || Spacewatch || — || align=right | 2.0 km || 
|-id=816 bgcolor=#E9E9E9
| 490816 ||  || — || August 12, 2010 || Kitt Peak || Spacewatch || — || align=right | 2.3 km || 
|-id=817 bgcolor=#C2FFFF
| 490817 ||  || — || November 6, 2010 || Mount Lemmon || Mount Lemmon Survey || L4 || align=right | 7.4 km || 
|-id=818 bgcolor=#E9E9E9
| 490818 ||  || — || April 11, 2008 || Mount Lemmon || Mount Lemmon Survey || — || align=right | 1.7 km || 
|-id=819 bgcolor=#E9E9E9
| 490819 ||  || — || September 5, 2010 || Mount Lemmon || Mount Lemmon Survey || — || align=right | 2.0 km || 
|-id=820 bgcolor=#C2FFFF
| 490820 ||  || — || September 15, 2009 || Kitt Peak || Spacewatch || L4 || align=right | 6.3 km || 
|-id=821 bgcolor=#E9E9E9
| 490821 ||  || — || October 29, 2010 || Mount Lemmon || Mount Lemmon Survey || WIT || align=right data-sort-value="0.90" | 900 m || 
|-id=822 bgcolor=#E9E9E9
| 490822 ||  || — || October 13, 2010 || Mount Lemmon || Mount Lemmon Survey || — || align=right | 2.3 km || 
|-id=823 bgcolor=#E9E9E9
| 490823 ||  || — || October 14, 2010 || Mount Lemmon || Mount Lemmon Survey || MAR || align=right | 1.1 km || 
|-id=824 bgcolor=#FA8072
| 490824 ||  || — || October 19, 2010 || Mount Lemmon || Mount Lemmon Survey || H || align=right data-sort-value="0.52" | 520 m || 
|-id=825 bgcolor=#E9E9E9
| 490825 ||  || — || August 19, 2010 || Kitt Peak || Spacewatch || — || align=right data-sort-value="0.96" | 960 m || 
|-id=826 bgcolor=#E9E9E9
| 490826 ||  || — || December 21, 2006 || Kitt Peak || Spacewatch || PAD || align=right | 1.5 km || 
|-id=827 bgcolor=#E9E9E9
| 490827 ||  || — || October 17, 2010 || Mount Lemmon || Mount Lemmon Survey || — || align=right | 1.8 km || 
|-id=828 bgcolor=#fefefe
| 490828 ||  || — || October 9, 2010 || Mount Lemmon || Mount Lemmon Survey || H || align=right data-sort-value="0.85" | 850 m || 
|-id=829 bgcolor=#E9E9E9
| 490829 ||  || — || November 2, 2010 || Mount Lemmon || Mount Lemmon Survey || — || align=right | 1.8 km || 
|-id=830 bgcolor=#E9E9E9
| 490830 ||  || — || October 12, 2010 || Mount Lemmon || Mount Lemmon Survey || — || align=right | 1.9 km || 
|-id=831 bgcolor=#fefefe
| 490831 ||  || — || August 12, 2010 || Kitt Peak || Spacewatch || — || align=right data-sort-value="0.70" | 700 m || 
|-id=832 bgcolor=#E9E9E9
| 490832 ||  || — || September 11, 2010 || Mount Lemmon || Mount Lemmon Survey || — || align=right | 2.9 km || 
|-id=833 bgcolor=#fefefe
| 490833 ||  || — || September 23, 2006 || Kitt Peak || Spacewatch || MAS || align=right data-sort-value="0.69" | 690 m || 
|-id=834 bgcolor=#C2FFFF
| 490834 ||  || — || December 23, 2012 || Haleakala || Pan-STARRS || L4 || align=right | 6.1 km || 
|-id=835 bgcolor=#C2FFFF
| 490835 ||  || — || September 7, 2008 || Mount Lemmon || Mount Lemmon Survey || L4 || align=right | 7.7 km || 
|-id=836 bgcolor=#d6d6d6
| 490836 ||  || — || October 27, 2005 || Mount Lemmon || Mount Lemmon Survey || KOR || align=right | 1.1 km || 
|-id=837 bgcolor=#fefefe
| 490837 ||  || — || September 25, 1995 || Kitt Peak || Spacewatch || MAS || align=right data-sort-value="0.46" | 460 m || 
|-id=838 bgcolor=#E9E9E9
| 490838 ||  || — || October 1, 2005 || Kitt Peak || Spacewatch || — || align=right | 1.9 km || 
|-id=839 bgcolor=#C2FFFF
| 490839 ||  || — || September 20, 2009 || Kitt Peak || Spacewatch || L4 || align=right | 6.8 km || 
|-id=840 bgcolor=#E9E9E9
| 490840 ||  || — || October 10, 2005 || Anderson Mesa || LONEOS || — || align=right | 2.0 km || 
|-id=841 bgcolor=#fefefe
| 490841 ||  || — || March 26, 2009 || Mount Lemmon || Mount Lemmon Survey || H || align=right data-sort-value="0.52" | 520 m || 
|-id=842 bgcolor=#fefefe
| 490842 ||  || — || May 4, 2006 || Siding Spring || SSS || H || align=right data-sort-value="0.84" | 840 m || 
|-id=843 bgcolor=#fefefe
| 490843 ||  || — || December 11, 2002 || Socorro || LINEAR || H || align=right data-sort-value="0.94" | 940 m || 
|-id=844 bgcolor=#E9E9E9
| 490844 ||  || — || November 11, 2010 || Mount Lemmon || Mount Lemmon Survey || — || align=right | 2.2 km || 
|-id=845 bgcolor=#d6d6d6
| 490845 ||  || — || February 18, 2010 || WISE || WISE || — || align=right | 3.4 km || 
|-id=846 bgcolor=#d6d6d6
| 490846 ||  || — || December 1, 2010 || Kitt Peak || Spacewatch || 615 || align=right | 1.7 km || 
|-id=847 bgcolor=#C2FFFF
| 490847 ||  || — || September 18, 2009 || Kitt Peak || Spacewatch || L4 || align=right | 6.8 km || 
|-id=848 bgcolor=#fefefe
| 490848 ||  || — || June 22, 2007 || Mount Lemmon || Mount Lemmon Survey || H || align=right data-sort-value="0.94" | 940 m || 
|-id=849 bgcolor=#fefefe
| 490849 ||  || — || October 29, 2010 || Catalina || CSS || H || align=right data-sort-value="0.69" | 690 m || 
|-id=850 bgcolor=#C2FFFF
| 490850 ||  || — || September 16, 2009 || Kitt Peak || Spacewatch || L4 || align=right | 6.4 km || 
|-id=851 bgcolor=#E9E9E9
| 490851 ||  || — || November 27, 2010 || Mount Lemmon || Mount Lemmon Survey || — || align=right | 1.7 km || 
|-id=852 bgcolor=#E9E9E9
| 490852 ||  || — || November 3, 2010 || Kitt Peak || Spacewatch || MRX || align=right | 1.1 km || 
|-id=853 bgcolor=#E9E9E9
| 490853 ||  || — || October 24, 2001 || Kitt Peak || Spacewatch || — || align=right | 2.9 km || 
|-id=854 bgcolor=#E9E9E9
| 490854 ||  || — || December 4, 2010 || Mount Lemmon || Mount Lemmon Survey || (5) || align=right data-sort-value="0.85" | 850 m || 
|-id=855 bgcolor=#E9E9E9
| 490855 ||  || — || April 30, 2008 || Kitt Peak || Spacewatch || — || align=right | 2.1 km || 
|-id=856 bgcolor=#d6d6d6
| 490856 ||  || — || January 16, 2010 || WISE || WISE || — || align=right | 2.9 km || 
|-id=857 bgcolor=#d6d6d6
| 490857 ||  || — || November 11, 2010 || Mount Lemmon || Mount Lemmon Survey || — || align=right | 2.5 km || 
|-id=858 bgcolor=#d6d6d6
| 490858 ||  || — || February 27, 2006 || Kitt Peak || Spacewatch || — || align=right | 2.5 km || 
|-id=859 bgcolor=#fefefe
| 490859 ||  || — || July 19, 2009 || La Sagra || OAM Obs. || H || align=right data-sort-value="0.59" | 590 m || 
|-id=860 bgcolor=#E9E9E9
| 490860 ||  || — || January 27, 2007 || Kitt Peak || Spacewatch || — || align=right | 1.1 km || 
|-id=861 bgcolor=#d6d6d6
| 490861 ||  || — || December 8, 2010 || Mount Lemmon || Mount Lemmon Survey || — || align=right | 3.6 km || 
|-id=862 bgcolor=#d6d6d6
| 490862 ||  || — || December 8, 2010 || Mount Lemmon || Mount Lemmon Survey || — || align=right | 3.5 km || 
|-id=863 bgcolor=#d6d6d6
| 490863 ||  || — || October 2, 2009 || Mount Lemmon || Mount Lemmon Survey || — || align=right | 2.7 km || 
|-id=864 bgcolor=#d6d6d6
| 490864 ||  || — || December 9, 2010 || Mount Lemmon || Mount Lemmon Survey || — || align=right | 2.9 km || 
|-id=865 bgcolor=#d6d6d6
| 490865 ||  || — || December 14, 2010 || Mount Lemmon || Mount Lemmon Survey || — || align=right | 1.7 km || 
|-id=866 bgcolor=#d6d6d6
| 490866 ||  || — || January 14, 2011 || Kitt Peak || Spacewatch || EOS || align=right | 1.6 km || 
|-id=867 bgcolor=#d6d6d6
| 490867 ||  || — || January 14, 2011 || Kitt Peak || Spacewatch || EOS || align=right | 1.8 km || 
|-id=868 bgcolor=#E9E9E9
| 490868 ||  || — || February 22, 2007 || Kitt Peak || Spacewatch || — || align=right data-sort-value="0.97" | 970 m || 
|-id=869 bgcolor=#d6d6d6
| 490869 ||  || — || February 1, 2006 || Kitt Peak || Spacewatch || — || align=right | 2.2 km || 
|-id=870 bgcolor=#d6d6d6
| 490870 ||  || — || January 13, 2011 || Mount Lemmon || Mount Lemmon Survey || — || align=right | 2.3 km || 
|-id=871 bgcolor=#d6d6d6
| 490871 ||  || — || December 13, 2010 || Mount Lemmon || Mount Lemmon Survey || EOS || align=right | 1.5 km || 
|-id=872 bgcolor=#d6d6d6
| 490872 ||  || — || January 28, 2006 || Kitt Peak || Spacewatch || — || align=right | 2.6 km || 
|-id=873 bgcolor=#E9E9E9
| 490873 ||  || — || December 5, 2010 || Mount Lemmon || Mount Lemmon Survey || — || align=right | 2.5 km || 
|-id=874 bgcolor=#d6d6d6
| 490874 ||  || — || January 16, 2011 || Mount Lemmon || Mount Lemmon Survey || — || align=right | 2.9 km || 
|-id=875 bgcolor=#fefefe
| 490875 ||  || — || January 8, 2011 || Mount Lemmon || Mount Lemmon Survey || H || align=right data-sort-value="0.87" | 870 m || 
|-id=876 bgcolor=#d6d6d6
| 490876 ||  || — || January 4, 2011 || Mount Lemmon || Mount Lemmon Survey || — || align=right | 2.7 km || 
|-id=877 bgcolor=#fefefe
| 490877 ||  || — || January 8, 2011 || Mount Lemmon || Mount Lemmon Survey || — || align=right data-sort-value="0.84" | 840 m || 
|-id=878 bgcolor=#d6d6d6
| 490878 ||  || — || January 27, 2011 || Kitt Peak || Spacewatch || — || align=right | 2.8 km || 
|-id=879 bgcolor=#d6d6d6
| 490879 ||  || — || January 18, 2010 || WISE || WISE || — || align=right | 2.6 km || 
|-id=880 bgcolor=#fefefe
| 490880 ||  || — || October 14, 2010 || Mount Lemmon || Mount Lemmon Survey || — || align=right data-sort-value="0.70" | 700 m || 
|-id=881 bgcolor=#d6d6d6
| 490881 ||  || — || December 18, 1999 || Kitt Peak || Spacewatch || — || align=right | 2.7 km || 
|-id=882 bgcolor=#d6d6d6
| 490882 ||  || — || January 17, 2010 || WISE || WISE || — || align=right | 2.8 km || 
|-id=883 bgcolor=#d6d6d6
| 490883 ||  || — || January 10, 2011 || Catalina || CSS || THB || align=right | 3.5 km || 
|-id=884 bgcolor=#fefefe
| 490884 ||  || — || January 30, 2011 || Haleakala || Pan-STARRS || — || align=right data-sort-value="0.68" | 680 m || 
|-id=885 bgcolor=#d6d6d6
| 490885 ||  || — || January 30, 2011 || Haleakala || Pan-STARRS || — || align=right | 3.5 km || 
|-id=886 bgcolor=#E9E9E9
| 490886 ||  || — || October 11, 2005 || Kitt Peak || Spacewatch || — || align=right | 1.0 km || 
|-id=887 bgcolor=#d6d6d6
| 490887 ||  || — || January 15, 2011 || Mount Lemmon || Mount Lemmon Survey || — || align=right | 2.9 km || 
|-id=888 bgcolor=#d6d6d6
| 490888 ||  || — || September 16, 2009 || Siding Spring || SSS || Tj (2.98) || align=right | 3.3 km || 
|-id=889 bgcolor=#d6d6d6
| 490889 ||  || — || January 25, 2011 || Mount Lemmon || Mount Lemmon Survey || — || align=right | 2.6 km || 
|-id=890 bgcolor=#d6d6d6
| 490890 ||  || — || December 8, 2010 || Mount Lemmon || Mount Lemmon Survey || — || align=right | 2.7 km || 
|-id=891 bgcolor=#d6d6d6
| 490891 ||  || — || January 29, 2011 || Kitt Peak || Spacewatch || — || align=right | 2.4 km || 
|-id=892 bgcolor=#fefefe
| 490892 ||  || — || January 4, 2011 || Catalina || CSS || H || align=right data-sort-value="0.71" | 710 m || 
|-id=893 bgcolor=#d6d6d6
| 490893 ||  || — || October 26, 2009 || Mount Lemmon || Mount Lemmon Survey || — || align=right | 4.8 km || 
|-id=894 bgcolor=#d6d6d6
| 490894 ||  || — || January 9, 2010 || WISE || WISE || — || align=right | 2.8 km || 
|-id=895 bgcolor=#d6d6d6
| 490895 ||  || — || January 26, 2011 || Mount Lemmon || Mount Lemmon Survey || — || align=right | 3.0 km || 
|-id=896 bgcolor=#d6d6d6
| 490896 ||  || — || December 10, 2010 || Mount Lemmon || Mount Lemmon Survey || THB || align=right | 2.3 km || 
|-id=897 bgcolor=#d6d6d6
| 490897 ||  || — || January 27, 2011 || Mount Lemmon || Mount Lemmon Survey || — || align=right | 2.5 km || 
|-id=898 bgcolor=#d6d6d6
| 490898 ||  || — || February 24, 2010 || WISE || WISE || — || align=right | 6.6 km || 
|-id=899 bgcolor=#d6d6d6
| 490899 ||  || — || February 4, 2005 || Mount Lemmon || Mount Lemmon Survey || — || align=right | 4.2 km || 
|-id=900 bgcolor=#E9E9E9
| 490900 ||  || — || January 30, 2011 || Haleakala || Pan-STARRS || — || align=right | 1.6 km || 
|}

490901–491000 

|-bgcolor=#d6d6d6
| 490901 ||  || — || August 6, 2008 || La Sagra || OAM Obs. || EOS || align=right | 2.5 km || 
|-id=902 bgcolor=#d6d6d6
| 490902 ||  || — || January 30, 2011 || Haleakala || Pan-STARRS || — || align=right | 2.1 km || 
|-id=903 bgcolor=#E9E9E9
| 490903 ||  || — || January 30, 2011 || Haleakala || Pan-STARRS || — || align=right | 1.4 km || 
|-id=904 bgcolor=#d6d6d6
| 490904 ||  || — || June 19, 2007 || Kitt Peak || Spacewatch || — || align=right | 2.4 km || 
|-id=905 bgcolor=#d6d6d6
| 490905 ||  || — || January 30, 2011 || Haleakala || Pan-STARRS || EOS || align=right | 1.8 km || 
|-id=906 bgcolor=#E9E9E9
| 490906 ||  || — || September 16, 2004 || Kitt Peak || Spacewatch || AST || align=right | 2.3 km || 
|-id=907 bgcolor=#d6d6d6
| 490907 ||  || — || January 9, 2011 || Kitt Peak || Spacewatch || — || align=right | 2.4 km || 
|-id=908 bgcolor=#d6d6d6
| 490908 ||  || — || January 26, 2011 || Mount Lemmon || Mount Lemmon Survey || — || align=right | 3.7 km || 
|-id=909 bgcolor=#d6d6d6
| 490909 ||  || — || January 26, 2006 || Kitt Peak || Spacewatch || — || align=right | 1.7 km || 
|-id=910 bgcolor=#E9E9E9
| 490910 ||  || — || October 24, 2005 || Kitt Peak || Spacewatch || — || align=right data-sort-value="0.84" | 840 m || 
|-id=911 bgcolor=#d6d6d6
| 490911 ||  || — || November 30, 2005 || Kitt Peak || Spacewatch || KOR || align=right | 1.3 km || 
|-id=912 bgcolor=#d6d6d6
| 490912 ||  || — || January 14, 2011 || Kitt Peak || Spacewatch || — || align=right | 3.1 km || 
|-id=913 bgcolor=#fefefe
| 490913 ||  || — || October 4, 2006 || Mount Lemmon || Mount Lemmon Survey || — || align=right data-sort-value="0.75" | 750 m || 
|-id=914 bgcolor=#E9E9E9
| 490914 ||  || — || October 3, 2005 || Kitt Peak || Spacewatch || — || align=right | 1.1 km || 
|-id=915 bgcolor=#d6d6d6
| 490915 ||  || — || September 20, 2003 || Kitt Peak || Spacewatch || EOS || align=right | 1.9 km || 
|-id=916 bgcolor=#fefefe
| 490916 ||  || — || March 15, 2004 || Kitt Peak || Spacewatch || MAS || align=right data-sort-value="0.54" | 540 m || 
|-id=917 bgcolor=#d6d6d6
| 490917 ||  || — || January 30, 2011 || Haleakala || Pan-STARRS || — || align=right | 3.1 km || 
|-id=918 bgcolor=#d6d6d6
| 490918 ||  || — || January 30, 2011 || Haleakala || Pan-STARRS || — || align=right | 2.8 km || 
|-id=919 bgcolor=#d6d6d6
| 490919 ||  || — || January 14, 2011 || Kitt Peak || Spacewatch || — || align=right | 2.1 km || 
|-id=920 bgcolor=#d6d6d6
| 490920 ||  || — || January 26, 2011 || Mount Lemmon || Mount Lemmon Survey || EOS || align=right | 2.0 km || 
|-id=921 bgcolor=#d6d6d6
| 490921 ||  || — || March 2, 2006 || Kitt Peak || Spacewatch || EOS || align=right | 1.4 km || 
|-id=922 bgcolor=#d6d6d6
| 490922 ||  || — || February 12, 2010 || WISE || WISE || — || align=right | 4.7 km || 
|-id=923 bgcolor=#d6d6d6
| 490923 ||  || — || January 26, 2011 || Kitt Peak || Spacewatch || EOS || align=right | 2.2 km || 
|-id=924 bgcolor=#fefefe
| 490924 ||  || — || September 16, 2003 || Kitt Peak || Spacewatch || — || align=right data-sort-value="0.57" | 570 m || 
|-id=925 bgcolor=#d6d6d6
| 490925 ||  || — || February 24, 2006 || Kitt Peak || Spacewatch || — || align=right | 2.2 km || 
|-id=926 bgcolor=#d6d6d6
| 490926 ||  || — || November 22, 2009 || Kitt Peak || Spacewatch || — || align=right | 2.7 km || 
|-id=927 bgcolor=#fefefe
| 490927 ||  || — || December 10, 2010 || Mount Lemmon || Mount Lemmon Survey || — || align=right data-sort-value="0.56" | 560 m || 
|-id=928 bgcolor=#d6d6d6
| 490928 ||  || — || October 21, 2009 || Catalina || CSS || — || align=right | 3.2 km || 
|-id=929 bgcolor=#d6d6d6
| 490929 ||  || — || August 7, 2008 || Kitt Peak || Spacewatch || — || align=right | 2.1 km || 
|-id=930 bgcolor=#fefefe
| 490930 ||  || — || January 30, 2011 || Haleakala || Pan-STARRS || — || align=right data-sort-value="0.59" | 590 m || 
|-id=931 bgcolor=#d6d6d6
| 490931 ||  || — || January 30, 2011 || Mount Lemmon || Mount Lemmon Survey || EOS || align=right | 1.8 km || 
|-id=932 bgcolor=#d6d6d6
| 490932 ||  || — || January 30, 2011 || Mount Lemmon || Mount Lemmon Survey || EOS || align=right | 1.7 km || 
|-id=933 bgcolor=#d6d6d6
| 490933 ||  || — || January 13, 2011 || Mount Lemmon || Mount Lemmon Survey || — || align=right | 3.2 km || 
|-id=934 bgcolor=#d6d6d6
| 490934 ||  || — || March 25, 2006 || Catalina || CSS || — || align=right | 4.6 km || 
|-id=935 bgcolor=#E9E9E9
| 490935 ||  || — || January 30, 2011 || Haleakala || Pan-STARRS || — || align=right | 1.6 km || 
|-id=936 bgcolor=#d6d6d6
| 490936 ||  || — || January 8, 2011 || Mount Lemmon || Mount Lemmon Survey || — || align=right | 2.3 km || 
|-id=937 bgcolor=#d6d6d6
| 490937 ||  || — || March 25, 2006 || Kitt Peak || Spacewatch || THM || align=right | 2.2 km || 
|-id=938 bgcolor=#d6d6d6
| 490938 ||  || — || January 30, 2011 || Haleakala || Pan-STARRS || — || align=right | 3.0 km || 
|-id=939 bgcolor=#E9E9E9
| 490939 ||  || — || February 4, 2011 || Haleakala || Pan-STARRS || — || align=right | 1.3 km || 
|-id=940 bgcolor=#d6d6d6
| 490940 ||  || — || November 11, 2004 || Socorro || LINEAR || Tj (2.94) || align=right | 2.9 km || 
|-id=941 bgcolor=#d6d6d6
| 490941 ||  || — || January 30, 2011 || Haleakala || Pan-STARRS || EOS || align=right | 1.8 km || 
|-id=942 bgcolor=#d6d6d6
| 490942 ||  || — || September 21, 2003 || Kitt Peak || Spacewatch || VER || align=right | 2.2 km || 
|-id=943 bgcolor=#d6d6d6
| 490943 ||  || — || January 30, 2011 || Haleakala || Pan-STARRS || NAE || align=right | 1.8 km || 
|-id=944 bgcolor=#d6d6d6
| 490944 ||  || — || January 28, 2011 || Kitt Peak || Spacewatch || — || align=right | 2.3 km || 
|-id=945 bgcolor=#d6d6d6
| 490945 ||  || — || February 2, 2010 || WISE || WISE || EOS || align=right | 1.3 km || 
|-id=946 bgcolor=#fefefe
| 490946 ||  || — || January 30, 2011 || Haleakala || Pan-STARRS || — || align=right data-sort-value="0.68" | 680 m || 
|-id=947 bgcolor=#d6d6d6
| 490947 ||  || — || January 30, 2011 || Haleakala || Pan-STARRS ||  || align=right | 2.5 km || 
|-id=948 bgcolor=#d6d6d6
| 490948 ||  || — || March 2, 2010 || WISE || WISE || — || align=right | 6.0 km || 
|-id=949 bgcolor=#d6d6d6
| 490949 ||  || — || September 28, 2008 || Mount Lemmon || Mount Lemmon Survey || — || align=right | 2.8 km || 
|-id=950 bgcolor=#d6d6d6
| 490950 ||  || — || February 4, 2011 || Haleakala || Pan-STARRS || — || align=right | 2.4 km || 
|-id=951 bgcolor=#d6d6d6
| 490951 ||  || — || June 15, 2007 || Kitt Peak || Spacewatch || — || align=right | 2.4 km || 
|-id=952 bgcolor=#d6d6d6
| 490952 ||  || — || January 30, 2011 || Haleakala || Pan-STARRS || — || align=right | 2.2 km || 
|-id=953 bgcolor=#d6d6d6
| 490953 ||  || — || February 4, 2011 || Haleakala || Pan-STARRS || — || align=right | 1.9 km || 
|-id=954 bgcolor=#d6d6d6
| 490954 ||  || — || November 16, 2009 || La Sagra || OAM Obs. || — || align=right | 3.7 km || 
|-id=955 bgcolor=#d6d6d6
| 490955 ||  || — || January 30, 2011 || Haleakala || Pan-STARRS || EOS || align=right | 1.5 km || 
|-id=956 bgcolor=#d6d6d6
| 490956 ||  || — || January 30, 2011 || Haleakala || Pan-STARRS || — || align=right | 2.2 km || 
|-id=957 bgcolor=#d6d6d6
| 490957 ||  || — || January 30, 2011 || Haleakala || Pan-STARRS || — || align=right | 3.2 km || 
|-id=958 bgcolor=#d6d6d6
| 490958 ||  || — || September 28, 2009 || Kitt Peak || Spacewatch || — || align=right | 2.5 km || 
|-id=959 bgcolor=#d6d6d6
| 490959 ||  || — || February 8, 2011 || Mount Lemmon || Mount Lemmon Survey || THM || align=right | 1.7 km || 
|-id=960 bgcolor=#d6d6d6
| 490960 ||  || — || February 26, 2011 || Catalina || CSS || — || align=right | 3.4 km || 
|-id=961 bgcolor=#d6d6d6
| 490961 ||  || — || January 28, 2011 || Kitt Peak || Spacewatch || — || align=right | 2.8 km || 
|-id=962 bgcolor=#d6d6d6
| 490962 ||  || — || April 29, 2006 || Anderson Mesa || LONEOS || — || align=right | 3.2 km || 
|-id=963 bgcolor=#d6d6d6
| 490963 ||  || — || September 10, 2007 || Mount Lemmon || Mount Lemmon Survey || — || align=right | 2.5 km || 
|-id=964 bgcolor=#d6d6d6
| 490964 ||  || — || June 21, 2007 || Mount Lemmon || Mount Lemmon Survey || — || align=right | 2.3 km || 
|-id=965 bgcolor=#fefefe
| 490965 ||  || — || January 26, 2011 || Mount Lemmon || Mount Lemmon Survey || — || align=right data-sort-value="0.80" | 800 m || 
|-id=966 bgcolor=#d6d6d6
| 490966 ||  || — || April 24, 2006 || Kitt Peak || Spacewatch || THM || align=right | 2.1 km || 
|-id=967 bgcolor=#d6d6d6
| 490967 ||  || — || February 26, 2011 || Catalina || CSS || — || align=right | 3.2 km || 
|-id=968 bgcolor=#d6d6d6
| 490968 ||  || — || January 30, 2011 || Haleakala || Pan-STARRS || — || align=right | 2.9 km || 
|-id=969 bgcolor=#fefefe
| 490969 ||  || — || July 14, 2009 || Kitt Peak || Spacewatch || BAP || align=right data-sort-value="0.80" | 800 m || 
|-id=970 bgcolor=#d6d6d6
| 490970 ||  || — || January 26, 2010 || WISE || WISE || — || align=right | 3.2 km || 
|-id=971 bgcolor=#d6d6d6
| 490971 ||  || — || February 22, 2011 || Kitt Peak || Spacewatch || — || align=right | 2.7 km || 
|-id=972 bgcolor=#d6d6d6
| 490972 ||  || — || March 6, 2011 || Mount Lemmon || Mount Lemmon Survey || — || align=right | 3.1 km || 
|-id=973 bgcolor=#d6d6d6
| 490973 ||  || — || March 5, 2011 || Catalina || CSS || — || align=right | 4.1 km || 
|-id=974 bgcolor=#d6d6d6
| 490974 ||  || — || February 26, 2011 || Kitt Peak || Spacewatch || — || align=right | 3.1 km || 
|-id=975 bgcolor=#d6d6d6
| 490975 ||  || — || March 12, 2011 || Mount Lemmon || Mount Lemmon Survey || — || align=right | 2.8 km || 
|-id=976 bgcolor=#d6d6d6
| 490976 ||  || — || November 20, 2009 || Mount Lemmon || Mount Lemmon Survey || — || align=right | 3.1 km || 
|-id=977 bgcolor=#d6d6d6
| 490977 ||  || — || March 11, 2011 || Kitt Peak || Spacewatch || HYG || align=right | 2.4 km || 
|-id=978 bgcolor=#d6d6d6
| 490978 ||  || — || July 12, 2007 || La Sagra || OAM Obs. || — || align=right | 3.5 km || 
|-id=979 bgcolor=#d6d6d6
| 490979 ||  || — || February 25, 2011 || Kitt Peak || Spacewatch || LIX || align=right | 3.3 km || 
|-id=980 bgcolor=#d6d6d6
| 490980 ||  || — || February 4, 2005 || Mount Lemmon || Mount Lemmon Survey || — || align=right | 2.5 km || 
|-id=981 bgcolor=#d6d6d6
| 490981 ||  || — || February 23, 2011 || Haleakala || Pan-STARRS || — || align=right | 3.5 km || 
|-id=982 bgcolor=#d6d6d6
| 490982 ||  || — || November 9, 2009 || Mount Lemmon || Mount Lemmon Survey || — || align=right | 2.9 km || 
|-id=983 bgcolor=#d6d6d6
| 490983 ||  || — || March 26, 2011 || Mount Lemmon || Mount Lemmon Survey || — || align=right | 3.9 km || 
|-id=984 bgcolor=#d6d6d6
| 490984 ||  || — || February 25, 2010 || WISE || WISE || — || align=right | 2.7 km || 
|-id=985 bgcolor=#d6d6d6
| 490985 ||  || — || April 24, 2006 || Kitt Peak || Spacewatch || — || align=right | 3.1 km || 
|-id=986 bgcolor=#d6d6d6
| 490986 ||  || — || April 9, 2010 || WISE || WISE || — || align=right | 3.7 km || 
|-id=987 bgcolor=#E9E9E9
| 490987 ||  || — || October 9, 2004 || Kitt Peak || Spacewatch || AST || align=right | 1.9 km || 
|-id=988 bgcolor=#d6d6d6
| 490988 ||  || — || March 1, 2011 || Mount Lemmon || Mount Lemmon Survey || THM || align=right | 2.1 km || 
|-id=989 bgcolor=#d6d6d6
| 490989 ||  || — || September 10, 2007 || Mount Lemmon || Mount Lemmon Survey || — || align=right | 3.0 km || 
|-id=990 bgcolor=#d6d6d6
| 490990 ||  || — || February 27, 2010 || WISE || WISE || — || align=right | 3.0 km || 
|-id=991 bgcolor=#fefefe
| 490991 ||  || — || December 24, 2006 || Kitt Peak || Spacewatch || NYS || align=right data-sort-value="0.58" | 580 m || 
|-id=992 bgcolor=#d6d6d6
| 490992 ||  || — || March 25, 2011 || Haleakala || Pan-STARRS || EOS || align=right | 1.9 km || 
|-id=993 bgcolor=#d6d6d6
| 490993 ||  || — || January 28, 2011 || Mount Lemmon || Mount Lemmon Survey || — || align=right | 2.4 km || 
|-id=994 bgcolor=#fefefe
| 490994 ||  || — || November 23, 2006 || Mount Lemmon || Mount Lemmon Survey || — || align=right data-sort-value="0.65" | 650 m || 
|-id=995 bgcolor=#d6d6d6
| 490995 ||  || — || September 29, 2009 || Mount Lemmon || Mount Lemmon Survey || — || align=right | 2.5 km || 
|-id=996 bgcolor=#E9E9E9
| 490996 ||  || — || January 30, 2006 || Kitt Peak || Spacewatch || AGN || align=right data-sort-value="0.93" | 930 m || 
|-id=997 bgcolor=#fefefe
| 490997 ||  || — || February 25, 2011 || Kitt Peak || Spacewatch || — || align=right | 1.2 km || 
|-id=998 bgcolor=#d6d6d6
| 490998 ||  || — || March 9, 2011 || Mount Lemmon || Mount Lemmon Survey || — || align=right | 2.7 km || 
|-id=999 bgcolor=#d6d6d6
| 490999 ||  || — || April 1, 2011 || Mount Lemmon || Mount Lemmon Survey || — || align=right | 4.0 km || 
|-id=000 bgcolor=#d6d6d6
| 491000 ||  || — || September 10, 2007 || Kitt Peak || Spacewatch || — || align=right | 2.8 km || 
|}

References

External links 
 Discovery Circumstances: Numbered Minor Planets (490001)–(495000) (IAU Minor Planet Center)

0490